The following is a list of players, both past and current, who appeared at least in one game for the Brooklyn Nets (2012–present), New Jersey Nets (1977–2012), or New York Nets (1976–1977) NBA franchise.



Players
Note: Statistics are correct through the end of the  season.

A

|-
|align="left"| || align="center"|F/C || align="left"|Baylor || align="center"|2 || align="center"|– || 102 || 1,869 || 364 || 75 || 620 || 18.3 || 3.6 || 0.7 || 6.1 || align=center|
|-
|align="left"| || align="center"|G || align="left"|Arizona || align="center"|1 || align="center"| || 61 || 495 || 77 || 13 || 174 || 8.1 || 1.3 || 0.2 || 2.9 || align=center|
|-
|align="left"| || align="center"|G/F || align="left"|Syracuse || align="center"|2 || align="center"|– || 144 || 2,339 || 297 || 121 || 872 || 16.2 || 2.1 || 0.8 || 6.1 || align=center|
|-
|align="left"| || align="center"|G || align="left"|Michigan State || align="center"|2 || align="center"|– || 34 || 185 || 19 || 7 || 70 || 5.4 || 0.6 || 0.2 || 2.1 || align=center|
|-
|align="left"| || align="center"|F/C || align="left"|Texas || align="center"|2 || align="center"|– || 152 || 3,537 || 1,060 || 159 || 1,460 || 23.3 || 7.0 || 1.0 || 9.6 || align=center|
|-
|align="left"| || align="center"|F/C || align="left"|Villanova || align="center"|1 || align="center"| || 48 || 763 || 128 || 29 || 261 || 15.9 || 2.7 || 0.6 || 5.4 || align=center|
|-
|align="left"| || align="center"|G || align="left"|Fresno State || align="center"|1 || align="center"| || 27 || 766 || 75 || 104 || 262 || 28.4 || 2.8 || 3.9 || 9.7 || align=center|
|-
|align="left"| || align="center"|G/F || align="left"|Michigan State || align="center"|2 || align="center"|– || 152 || 3,517 || 379 || 164 || 1,109 || 23.1 || 2.5 || 1.1 || 7.3 || align=center|
|-
|align="left"| || align="center"|F/C || align="left"|Houston || align="center"|1 || align="center"| || 1 || 18 || 6 || 1 || 8 || 18.0 || 6.0 || 1.0 || 8.0 || align=center|
|-
|align="left"| || align="center"|C || align="left"|Augsburg || align="center"|2 || align="center"|– || 103 || 3,303 || 1,073 || 126 || 1,426 || 32.1 || 10.4 || 1.2 || 13.8 || align=center|
|-
|align="left" bgcolor="#FFCC00"|+ || align="center"|G || align="left"|Georgia Tech || align="center"|5 || align="center"|– || 304 || 9,962 || 1,026 || 2,363 || 4,655 || 32.8 || 3.4 || 7.8 || 15.3 || align=center|
|-
|align="left"| || align="center"|G/F || align="left"|Fresno State || align="center"|1 || align="center"| || 11 || 176 || 26 || 6 || 44 || 16.0 || 2.4 || 0.5 || 4.0 || align=center|
|-
|align="left"| || align="center"|F || align="left"|California || align="center"|1 || align="center"| || 66 || 1,312 || 311 || 52 || 487 || 19.9 || 4.7 || 0.8 || 7.4 || align=center|
|-
|align="left" bgcolor="#FFFF99"|^ || align="center"|G || align="left"|UTEP || align="center"|1 || align="center"| || 34 || 1,277 || 80 || 254 || 697 || 37.6 || 2.4 || 7.5 || 20.5 || align=center|
|-
|align="left"| || align="center"|F/C || align="left"|Cincinnati || align="center"|3 || align="center"|– || 186 || 2,598 || 853 || 88 || 964 || 14.0 || 4.6 || 0.5 || 5.2 || align=center|
|-
|align="left"| || align="center"|G || align="left"|Pepperdine || align="center"|3 || align="center"|– || 108 || 699 || 63 || 24 || 239 || 6.5 || 0.6 || 0.2 || 2.2 || align=center|
|-
|align="left"| || align="center"|G || align="left"|Fayetteville State || align="center"|1 || align="center"| || 50 || 549 || 67 || 73 || 123 || 11.0 || 1.3 || 1.5 || 2.5 || align=center|
|-
|align="left"| || align="center"|F || align="left"|Notre Dame || align="center"|1 || align="center"| || 13 || 98 || 22 || 5 || 40 || 7.5 || 1.7 || 0.4 || 3.1 || align=center|
|-
|align="left"| || align="center"|G/F || align="left"|Memphis || align="center"|1 || align="center"| || 1 || 7 || 0 || 0 || 0 || 7.0 || 0.0 || 0.0 || 0.0 || align=center|
|-
|align="left"| || align="center"|G || align="left"|Boston College || align="center"|1 || align="center"| || 41 || 692 || 64 || 58 || 317 || 16.9 || 1.6 || 1.4 || 7.7 || align=center|
|-
|align="left"| || align="center"|G || align="left"|Pepperdine || align="center"|1 || align="center"| || 21 || 409 || 33 || 68 || 174 || 19.5 || 1.6 || 3.2 || 8.3 || align=center|
|}

B

|-
|align="left"| || align="center"|G || align="left"|Boston College || align="center"|2 || align="center"|– || 150 || 4,416 || 401 || 870 || 1,481 || 29.4 || 2.7 || 5.8 || 9.9 || align=center|
|-
|align="left"| || align="center"|F/C || align="left"|Rutgers || align="center"|3 || align="center"|– || 107 || 1,880 || 486 || 74 || 895 || 17.6 || 4.5 || 0.7 || 8.4 || align=center|
|-
|align="left"| || align="center"|F/C || align="left"|Saint Joseph's || align="center"|1 || align="center"| || 33 || 1,114 || 285 || 50 || 614 || 33.8 || 8.6 || 1.5 || 18.6 || align=center|
|-
|align="left"| || align="center"|F/C || align="left"|Italy || align="center"|1 || align="center"| || 46 || 634 || 97 || 18 || 304 || 13.8 || 2.1 || 0.4 || 6.6 || align=center|
|-
|align="left" bgcolor="#FFFF99"|^ || align="center"|F || align="left"|Miami (FL) || align="center"|2 || align="center"|– || 139 || 6,118 || 1,003 || 621 || 4,252 || bgcolor="#CFECEC"|44.0 || 7.2 || 4.5 || bgcolor="#CFECEC"|30.6 || align=center|
|-
|align="left"| || align="center"|F/C || align="left"|Georgia || align="center"|5 || align="center"|– || 314 || 7,306 || 2,012 || 340 || 1,785 || 23.3 || 6.4 || 1.1 || 5.7 || align=center|
|-
|align="left"| || align="center"|F/C || align="left"|Texas Tech || align="center"|1 || align="center"| || 15 || 134 || 23 || 3 || 36 || 8.9 || 1.5 || 0.2 || 2.4 || align=center|
|-
|align="left"| || align="center"|F || align="left"|Temple || align="center"|2 || align="center"|– || 119 || 1,622 || 336 || 48 || 796 || 13.6 || 2.8 || 0.4 || 6.7 || align=center|
|-
|align="left"| || align="center"|C || align="left"|Norfolk State || align="center"|1 || align="center"| || 12 || 118 || 46 || 0 || 30 || 9.8 || 3.8 || 0.0 || 2.5 || align=center|
|-
|align="left"| || align="center"|F || align="left"|Arizona State || align="center"|1 || align="center"| || 8 || 46 || 6 || 1 || 23 || 5.8 || 0.8 || 0.1 || 2.9 || align=center|
|-
|align="left"| || align="center"|C || align="left"|Creighton || align="center"|2 || align="center"|– || 138 || 3,415 || 939 || 82 || 1,393 || 24.7 || 6.8 || 0.6 || 10.1 || align=center|
|-
|align="left"| || align="center"|F || align="left"|UNLV || align="center"|1 || align="center"| || 23 || 264 || 78 || 12 || 115 || 11.5 || 3.4 || 0.5 || 5.0 || align=center|
|-
|align="left"| || align="center"|F || align="left"|Alabama || align="center"|1 || align="center"| || 53 || 799 || 141 || 17 || 282 || 15.1 || 2.7 || 0.3 || 5.3 || align=center|
|-
|align="left"| || align="center"|F || align="left"|St. John's || align="center"|1 || align="center"| || 29 || 556 || 115 || 20 || 259 || 19.2 || 4.0 || 0.7 || 8.9 || align=center|
|-
|align="left"| || align="center"|G || align="left"|Georgia Tech || align="center"|1 || align="center"| || 76 || 1,461 || 107 || 143 || 514 || 19.2 || 1.4 || 1.9 || 6.8 || align=center|
|-
|align="left" bgcolor="#FFCC00"|+ || align="center"|G || align="left"|Houston || align="center"|7 || align="center"|– || 375 || 11,324 || 941 || 1,361 || 5,968 || 30.2 || 2.5 || 3.6 || 15.9 || align=center|
|-
|align="left"| || align="center"|F || align="left"|South Kent School (CT) || align="center"|2 || align="center"|– || 155 || 3,173 || 807 || 197 || 1,664 || 20.5 || 5.2 || 1.3 || 10.7 || align=center|
|-
|align="left"| || align="center"|G || align="left"|Oklahoma || align="center"|3 || align="center"|– || 194 || 6,400 || 658 || 1,143 || 2,518 || 33.0 || 3.4 || 5.9 || 13.0 || align=center|
|-
|align="left"| || align="center"|G/F || align="left"|Kentucky || align="center"|2 || align="center"|– || 79 || 1,502 || 131 || 79 || 332 || 19.0 || 1.7 || 1.0 || 4.2 || align=center|
|-
|align="left"| || align="center"|G/F || align="left"|Croatia || align="center"|3 || align="center"|– || 212 || 5,451 || 665 || 257 || 2,370 || 25.7 || 3.1 || 1.2 || 11.2 || align=center|
|-
|align="left"| || align="center"|F || align="left"|Clemson || align="center"|2 || align="center"|– || 89 || 2,149 || 690 || 176 || 890 || 24.1 || 7.8 || 2.0 || 10.0 || align=center|
|-
|align="left"| || align="center"|F/C || align="left"|UConn || align="center"|4 || align="center"|– || 256 || 4,482 || 1,258 || 125 || 1,340 || 17.5 || 4.9 || 0.5 || 5.2 || align=center|
|-
|align="left"| || align="center"|F/C || align="left"|Grambling State || align="center"|1 || align="center"| || 76 || 1,550 || 455 || 52 || 455 || 20.4 || 6.0 || 0.7 || 6.0 || align=center|
|-
|align="left"| || align="center"|F/C || align="left"|Kentucky || align="center"|4 || align="center"|– || 280 || 8,394 || 2,304 || 551 || 3,578 || 30.0 || 8.2 || 2.0 || 12.8 || align=center|
|-
|align="left"| || align="center"|G || align="left"|Eastern Michigan || align="center"|1 || align="center"| || 5 || 51 || 4 || 6 || 21 || 10.2 || 0.8 || 1.2 || 4.2 || align=center|
|-
|align="left"| || align="center"|G/F || align="left"|San Francisco || align="center"|2 || align="center"|– || 133 || 2,278 || 288 || 170 || 1,191 || 17.1 || 2.2 || 1.3 || 9.0 || align=center|
|-
|align="left"| || align="center"|G/F || align="left"|North Carolina || align="center"|1 || align="center"| || 63 || 1,432 || 126 || 150 || 423 || 22.7 || 2.0 || 2.4 || 6.7 || align=center|
|-
|align="left"| || align="center"|C || align="left"|BYU || align="center"|2 || align="center"|– || 107 || 3,223 || 857 || 75 || 1,318 || 30.1 || 8.0 || 0.7 || 12.3 || align=center|
|-
|align="left"| || align="center"|G/F || align="left"|Maryland || align="center"|1 || align="center"| || 20 || 308 || 48 || 16 || 133 || 15.4 || 2.4 || 0.8 || 6.7 || align=center|
|-
|align="left"| || align="center"|G || align="left"|Arkansas || align="center"|1 || align="center"| || 11 || 245 || 18 || 11 || 114 || 22.3 || 1.6 || 1.0 || 10.4 || align=center|
|-
|align="left"| || align="center"|G/F || align="left"|Providence || align="center"|2 || align="center"|– || 129 || 2,560 || 304 || 207 || 1,102 || 19.8 || 2.4 || 1.6 || 8.5 || align=center|
|-
|align="left"| || align="center"|F || align="left"|NC State || align="center"|1 || align="center"| || 77 || 1,186 || 232 || 51 || 391 || 15.4 || 3.0 || 0.7 || 5.1 || align=center|
|-
|align="left"| || align="center"|F || align="left"|Syracuse || align="center"|1 || align="center"| || 3 || 17 || 5 || 0 || 3 || 5.7 || 1.7 || 0.0 || 1.0 || align=center|
|-
|align="left"| || align="center"|G || align="left"|Oklahoma State || align="center"|2 || align="center"|– || 109 || 1,763 || 229 || 130 || 579 || 16.2 || 2.1 || 1.2 || 5.3 || align=center|
|-
|align="left"| || align="center"|F/C || align="left"|Louisiana Tech || align="center"|3 || align="center"|– || 240 || 7,358 || 1,540 || 393 || 2,016 || 30.7 || 6.4 || 1.6 || 8.4 || align=center|
|-
|align="left"| || align="center"|G/F || align="left"|Arkansas || align="center"|1 || align="center"| || 77 || 2,339 || 219 || 259 || 873 || 30.4 || 2.8 || 3.4 || 11.3 || align=center|
|-
|align="left"| || align="center"|F || align="left"|DePaul || align="center"|1 || align="center"| || 16 || 128 || 26 || 3 || 37 || 8.0 || 1.6 || 0.2 || 2.3 || align=center|
|-
|align="left"| || align="center"|G || align="left"|Manhattan || align="center"|1 || align="center"| || 13 || 236 || 8 || 36 || 86 || 18.2 || 0.6 || 2.8 || 6.6 || align=center|
|-
|align="left"| || align="center"|G || align="left"|Manhattan || align="center"|1 || align="center"| || 33 || 237 || 37 || 15 || 128 || 7.2 || 1.1 || 0.5 || 3.9 || align=center|
|-
|align="left"| || align="center"|G/F || align="left"|Arizona || align="center"|2 || align="center"|– || 76 || 888 || 143 || 53 || 240 || 11.7 || 1.9 || 0.7 || 3.2 || align=center|
|-
|align="left"| || align="center"|G/F || align="left"|Creighton || align="center"|1 || align="center"| || 64 || 1,313 || 189 || 63 || 445 || 20.5 || 3.0 || 1.0 || 7.0 || align=center|
|-
|align="left"| || align="center"|F/C || align="left"|North Carolina || align="center"|1 || align="center"| || 39 || 687 || 142 || 34 || 190 || 17.6 || 3.6 || 0.9 || 4.9 || align=center|
|-
|align="left"| || align="center"|G || align="left"|Saint Louis || align="center"|1 || align="center"| || 3 || 34 || 2 || 4 || 7 || 11.3 || 0.7 || 1.3 || 2.3 || align=center|
|-
|align="left"| || align="center"|G/F || align="left"|UConn || align="center"|2 || align="center"|– || 106 || 2,042 || 375 || 117 || 663 || 19.3 || 3.5 || 1.1 || 6.3 || align=center|
|}

C

|-
|align="left"| || align="center"|F/C || align="left"|San Diego State || align="center"|2 || align="center"| || 99 || 1,443 || 389 || 41 || 133 || 14.6 || 3.9 || 0.4 || 1.3 || align=center|
|-
|align="left"| || align="center"|F/C || align="left"|Lamar || align="center"|1 || align="center"| || 18 || 204 || 56 || 5 || 29 || 11.3 || 3.1 || 0.3 || 1.6 || align=center|
|-
|align="left"| || align="center"|C || align="left"|Georgia Tech || align="center"|1 || align="center"| || 12 || 261 || 85 || 11 || 56 || 21.8 || 7.1 || 0.9 || 4.7 || align=center|
|-
|align="left"| || align="center"|C || align="left"|Clemson || align="center"|1 || align="center"| || 10 || 50 || 11 || 3 || 2 || 5.0 || 1.1 || 0.3 || 0.2 || align=center|
|-
|align="left"| || align="center"|G || align="left"|Virginia || align="center"|1 || align="center"| || 5 || 21 || 0 || 5 || 2 || 4.2 || 0.0 || 1.0 || 0.4 || align=center|
|-
|align="left"| || align="center"|G || align="left"|Southern Illinois || align="center"|1 || align="center"| || 28 || 364 || 59 || 16 || 184 || 13.0 || 2.1 || 0.6 || 6.6 || align=center|
|-
|align="left"| || align="center"|G/F || align="left"|Boston College || align="center"|1 || align="center"| || 37 || 1,032 || 112 || 55 || 386 || 27.9 || 3.0 || 1.5 || 10.4 || align=center|
|-
|align="left"| || align="center"|F || align="left"|Missouri || align="center"|2 || align="center"|– || 140 || 3,883 || 828 || 232 || 1,727 || 27.7 || 5.9 || 1.7 || 12.3 || align=center|
|-
|align="left"| || align="center"|F/C || align="left"|Purdue || align="center"|2 || align="center"|– || 110 || 2,998 || 723 || 148 || 1,305 || 27.3 || 6.6 || 1.3 || 11.9 || align=center|
|-
|align="left"| || align="center"|G/F || align="left"|St. Bonaventure || align="center"|1 || align="center"| || 83 || 2,976 || 515 || 173 || 1,578 || 35.9 || 6.2 || 2.1 || 19.0 || align=center|
|-
|align="left" bgcolor="#FFCC00"|+ || align="center"|G/F || align="left"|North Carolina || align="center"|5 || align="center"|– || 374 || 14,157 || 2,152 || 1,762 || 8,834 || 37.9 || 5.8 || 4.7 || 23.6 || align=center|
|-
|align="left"| || align="center"|G || align="left"|Florida State || align="center"|3 || align="center"|– || 102 || 3,483 || 316 || 771 || 1,988 || 34.1 || 3.1 || 7.6 || 19.5 || align=center|
|-
|align="left"| || align="center"|F/C || align="left"|Hardin-Simmons || align="center"|1 || align="center"| || 32 || 659 || 204 || 30 || 195 || 20.6 || 6.4 || 0.9 || 6.1 || align=center|
|-
|align="left"| || align="center"|F || align="left"|Auburn || align="center"|1 || align="center"| || 29 || 185 || 34 || 4 || 92 || 6.4 || 1.2 || 0.1 || 3.2 || align=center|
|-
|align="left"| || align="center"|C || align="left"|Texas Southern || align="center"|1 || align="center"| || 5 || 16 || 2 || 0 || 6 || 3.2 || 0.4 || 0.0 || 1.2 || align=center|
|-
|align="left" bgcolor="#FFFF99"|^ || align="center"|G || align="left"|West Texas A&M || align="center"|1 || align="center"| || 35 || 510 || 42 || 107 || 126 || 14.6 || 1.2 || 3.1 || 3.6 || align=center|
|-
|align="left"| || align="center"|G/F || align="left"|Stanford || align="center"|1 || align="center"| || 14 || 100 || 15 || 5 || 14 || 7.1 || 1.1 || 0.4 || 1.0 || align=center|
|-
|align="left"| || align="center"|G || align="left"|Boise State || align="center"|3 || align="center"|– || 143 || 3,535 || 319 || 783 || 1,325 || 24.7 || 2.2 || 5.5 || 9.3 || align=center|
|-
|align="left"| || align="center"|F/C || align="left"|Marquette || align="center"|1 || align="center"| || 82 || 2,153 || 586 || 95 || 932 || 26.3 || 7.1 || 1.2 || 11.4 || align=center|
|-
|align="left"| || align="center"|C || align="left"|Grambling State || align="center"|1 || align="center"| || 1 || 4 || 2 || 0 || 2 || 4.0 || 2.0 || 0.0 || 2.0 || align=center|
|-
|align="left"| || align="center"|G || align="left"|Rhode Island || align="center"|2 || align="center"|– || 39 || 1,060 || 138 || 165 || 564 || 27.2 || 3.5 || 4.2 || 14.5 || align=center|
|-
|align="left"| || align="center"|F || align="left"|Louisville || align="center"|1 || align="center"| || 10 || 93 || 23 || 3 || 27 || 9.3 || 2.3 || 0.3 || 2.7 || align=center|
|-
|align="left"| || align="center"|F || align="left"|Maryland || align="center"|2 || align="center"|– || 95 || 1,686 || 461 || 76 || 749 || 17.7 || 4.9 || 0.8 || 7.9 || align=center|
|-
|align="left" bgcolor="#FFCC00"|+ || align="center"|F || align="left"|Syracuse || align="center"|5 || align="center"|– || 348 || 12,449 || 3,690 || 1,093 || 6,930 || 35.8 || 10.6 || 3.1 || 19.9 || align=center|
|-
|align="left"| || align="center"|C || align="left"|Stanford || align="center"|8 || align="center"|– || 532 || 12,664 || 2,323 || 565 || 2,292 || 23.8 || 4.4 || 1.1 || 4.3 || align=center|
|-
|align="left"| || align="center"|F || align="left"|DePaul || align="center"|1 || align="center"| || 75 || 1,122 || 218 || 65 || 418 || 15.0 || 2.9 || 0.9 || 5.6 || align=center|
|-
|align="left"| || align="center"|G || align="left"|BYU || align="center"|1 || align="center"| || 42 || 579 || 54 || 97 || 160 || 13.8 || 1.3 || 2.3 || 3.8 || align=center|
|-
|align="left"| || align="center"|G || align="left"|Oregon State || align="center"|3 || align="center"|– || 199 || 5,376 || 677 || 1,047 || 1,636 || 27.0 || 3.4 || 5.3 || 8.2 || align=center|
|-
|align="left"| || align="center"|G || align="left"|Portland || align="center"|6 || align="center"|– || 464 || 11,593 || 1,056 || 1,970 || 4,699 || 25.0 || 2.3 || 4.2 || 10.1 || align=center|
|-
|align="left"| || align="center"|F/C || align="left"|Colorado || align="center"|1 || align="center"| || 1 || 11 || 2 || 0 || 2 || 11.0 || 2.0 || 0.0 || 2.0 || align=center|
|-
|align="left"| || align="center"|G/F || align="left"|California || align="center"|2 || align="center"|– || 118 || 3,330 || 472 || 163 || 1,403 || 28.2 || 4.0 || 1.4 || 11.9 || align=center|
|-
|align="left"| || align="center"|G || align="left"|Australia || align="center"|1 || align="center"| || 4 || 36 || 10 || 5 || 15 || 9.0 || 2.5 || 1.3 || 3.8 || align=center|
|-
|align="left"| || align="center"|F || align="left"|Duke || align="center"|1 || align="center"| || 15 || 154 || 27 || 8 || 84 || 10.3 || 1.8 || 0.5 || 5.6 || align=center|
|-
|align="left"| || align="center"|F || align="left"|Villanova || align="center"|1 || align="center"| || 22 || 447 || 105 || 22 || 164 || 20.3 || 4.8 || 1.0 || 7.5 || align=center|
|-
|align="left"| || align="center"|C || align="left"|Temple || align="center"|1 || align="center"| || 15 || 161 || 28 || 1 || 6 || 10.7 || 1.9 || 0.1 || 0.4 || align=center|
|}

D

|-
|align="left"| || align="center"|G || align="left"|Mt. SAC || align="center"|1 || align="center"| || 17 || 282 || 39 || 25 || 92 || 16.6 || 2.3 || 1.5 || 5.4 || align=center|
|-
|align="left" bgcolor="#FFFF99"|^ || align="center"|C || align="left"|New Mexico || align="center"|1 || align="center"| || 11 || 126 || 34 || 6 || 39 || 11.5 || 3.1 || 0.5 || 3.5 || align=center|
|-
|align="left"| || align="center"|F/C || align="left"|Michigan || align="center"|1 || align="center"| || 30 || 726 || 214 || 42 || 344 || 24.2 || 7.1 || 1.4 || 11.5 || align=center|
|-
|align="left"| || align="center"|C || align="left"|George Washington || align="center"|4 || align="center"|– || 110 || 1,002 || 281 || 4 || 233 || 9.1 || 2.6 || 0.0 || 2.1 || align=center|
|-
|align="left"| || align="center"|F || align="left"|BYU || align="center"|1 || align="center"| || 7 || 44 || 10 || 2 || 16 || 6.3 || 1.4 || 0.3 || 2.3 || align=center|
|-
|align="left"| || align="center"|F || align="left"|North Carolina || align="center"|1 || align="center"| || 81 || 1,446 || 694 || 61 || 472 || 17.9 || 8.6 || 0.8 || 5.8 || align=center|
|-
|align="left"| || align="center"|G || align="left"|North Carolina || align="center"|1 || align="center"| || 14 || 55 || 8 || 3 || 4 || 3.9 || 0.6 || 0.2 || 0.3 || align=center|
|-
|align="left"| || align="center"|F || align="left"|St. John's || align="center"|1 || align="center"| || 34 || 752 || 193 || 47 || 296 || 22.1 || 5.7 || 1.4 || 8.7 || align=center|
|-
|align="left"| || align="center"|C || align="left"|Maynard Evans HS (FL) || align="center"|5 || align="center"|– || 258 || 6,795 || 1,412 || 361 || 3,687 || 26.3 || 5.5 || 1.4 || 14.3 || align=center|
|-
|align="left"| || align="center"|G || align="left"|Saint Joseph's || align="center"|1 || align="center"| || 8 || 47 || 6 || 8 || 10 || 5.9 || 0.8 || 1.0 || 1.3 || align=center|
|-
|align="left"| || align="center"|G || align="left"|St. John's || align="center"|3 || align="center"|– || 119 || 2,281 || 226 || 185 || 830 || 19.2 || 1.9 || 1.6 || 7.0 || align=center|
|-
|align="left"| || align="center"|G || align="left"|Eastern Michigan || align="center"|1 || align="center"| || 25 || 249 || 45 || 31 || 73 || 10.0 || 1.8 || 1.2 || 2.9 || align=center|
|-
|align="left"| || align="center"|F || align="left"|Idaho || align="center"|1 || align="center"| || 11 || 61 || 9 || 1 || 13 || 5.5 || 0.8 || 0.1 || 1.2 || align=center|
|-
|align="left" bgcolor="#CCFFCC"|x || align="center"|G || align="left"|Colorado || align="center"|3 || align="center"|– || 207 || 5,554 || 589 || 1,020 || 2,582 || 26.8 || 2.8 || 4.9 || 12.5 || align=center|
|-
|align="left"| || align="center"|C || align="left"|Senegal || align="center"|1 || align="center"| || 27 || 401 || 122 || 14 || 68 || 14.9 || 4.5 || 0.5 || 2.5 || align=center|
|-
|align="left"| || align="center"|G || align="left"|Missouri || align="center"|2 || align="center"|– || 130 || 3,045 || 209 || 405 || 1,112 || 23.4 || 1.6 || 3.1 || 8.6 || align=center|
|-
|align="left"| || align="center"|G || align="left"|Syracuse || align="center"|3 || align="center"|– || 159 || 3,102 || 238 || 497 || 1,097 || 19.5 || 1.5 || 3.1 || 6.9 || align=center|
|-
|align="left"| || align="center"|G || align="left"|Memphis || align="center"|2 || align="center"|– || 111 || 2,315 || 248 || 145 || 873 || 20.9 || 2.2 || 1.3 || 7.9 || align=center|
|-
|align="left"| || align="center"|F || align="left"|St. John's || align="center"|3 || align="center"|– || 165 || 4,573 || 1,220 || 196 || 2,284 || 27.7 || 7.4 || 1.2 || 13.8 || align=center|
|-
|align="left"| || align="center"|G || align="left"|Loyola (IL) || align="center"|1 || align="center"| || 10 || 125 || 18 || 10 || 34 || 12.5 || 1.8 || 1.0 || 3.4 || align=center|
|-
|align="left"| || align="center"|C || align="left"|Yale || align="center"|4 || align="center"|– || 241 || 5,532 || 1,983 || 130 || 1,305 || 23.0 || 8.2 || 0.5 || 5.4 || align=center|
|-
|align="left"| || align="center"|G/F || align="left"|Boston College || align="center"|1 || align="center"| || 59 || 1,220 || 155 || 83 || 287 || 20.7 || 2.6 || 1.4 || 4.9 || align=center|
|-
|align="left"| || align="center"|F || align="left"|Duquesne || align="center"|1 || align="center"| || 1 || 1 || 0 || 0 || 0 || 1.0 || 0.0 || 0.0 || 0.0 || align=center|
|}

E to F

|-
|align="left"| || align="center"|C || align="left"|BYU || align="center"|1 || align="center"| || 34 || 463 || 120 || 18 || 211 || 13.6 || 3.5 || 0.5 || 6.2 || align=center|
|-
|align="left"| || align="center"|G || align="left"|DePaul || align="center"|5 || align="center"|– || 189 || 5,029 || 470 || 413 || 2,015 || 26.6 || 2.5 || 2.2 || 10.7 || align=center|
|-
|align="left"| || align="center"|G || align="left"|North Carolina || align="center"|1 || align="center"| || 76 || 1,615 || 174 || 83 || 586 || 21.3 || 2.3 || 1.1 || 7.7 || align=center|
|-
|align="left"| || align="center"|F/C || align="left"|Arizona || align="center"|3 || align="center"|– || 141 || 2,324 || 502 || 204 || 980 || 16.5 || 3.6 || 1.4 || 7.0 || align=center|
|-
|align="left"| || align="center"|F/C || align="left"|Maryland || align="center"|2 || align="center"|– || 155 || 3,075 || 679 || 139 || 983 || 19.8 || 4.4 || 0.9 || 6.3 || align=center|
|-
|align="left"| || align="center"|F || align="left"|Texas Tech || align="center"|1 || align="center"| || 6 || 45 || 6 || 1 || 13 || 7.5 || 1.0 || 0.2 || 2.2 || align=center|
|-
|align="left"| || align="center"|C || align="left"|Wyoming || align="center"|3 || align="center"|– || 79 || 605 || 158 || 19 || 162 || 7.7 || 2.0 || 0.2 || 2.1 || align=center|
|-
|align="left" bgcolor="#FFFF99"|^ (#32) || align="center"|G/F || align="left"|UMass || align="center"|3 || align="center"|– || 252 || 10,044 || 2,738 || 1,319 || 7,104 || 39.9 || 10.9 || 5.2 || 28.2 || align=center|
|-
|align="left"| || align="center"|C || align="left"|Northwestern || align="center"|2 || align="center"|– || 105 || 1,704 || 474 || 61 || 342 || 16.2 || 4.5 || 0.6 || 3.3 || align=center|
|-
|align="left"| || align="center"|G || align="left"|Boston College || align="center"|1 || align="center"| || 53 || 602 || 39 || 100 || 102 || 11.4 || 0.7 || 1.9 || 1.9 || align=center|
|-
|align="left"| || align="center"|F || align="left"|Indiana || align="center"|2 || align="center"|– || 39 || 453 || 69 || 38 || 145 || 11.6 || 1.8 || 1.0 || 3.7 || align=center|
|-
|align="left"| || align="center"|F || align="left"|Iowa || align="center"|2 || align="center"|– || 110 || 2,366 || 1,037 || 48 || 444 || 21.5 || 9.4 || 0.4 || 4.0 || align=center|
|-
|align="left"| || align="center"|F || align="left"|Morehead State || align="center"|1 || align="center"| || 12 || 118 || 44 || 2 || 61 || 9.8 || 3.7 || 0.2 || 5.1 || align=center|
|-
|align="left"| || align="center"|G || align="left"|UCLA || align="center"|2 || align="center"|– || 112 || 2,627 || 234 || 497 || 1,107 || 23.5 || 2.1 || 4.4 || 9.9 || align=center|
|-
|align="left"| || align="center"|F/C || align="left"|Georgia Tech || align="center"|1 || align="center"| || 56 || 1,091 || 297 || 21 || 353 || 19.5 || 5.3 || 0.4 || 6.3 || align=center|
|-
|align="left"| || align="center"|C || align="left"|Michigan State || align="center"|3 || align="center"|– || 113 || 3,239 || 1,097 || 97 || 658 || 28.7 || 9.7 || 0.9 || 5.8 || align=center|
|-
|align="left"| || align="center"|C || align="left"|UTEP || align="center"|1 || align="center"| || 34 || 175 || 61 || 6 || 82 || 5.1 || 1.8 || 0.2 || 2.4 || align=center|
|-
|align="left"| || align="center"|G || align="left"|Indiana || align="center"|1 || align="center"| || 10 || 151 || 12 || 17 || 54 || 15.1 || 1.2 || 1.7 || 5.4 || align=center|
|-
|align="left"| || align="center"|G || align="left"|Georgia || align="center"|1 || align="center"| || 77 || 1,747 || 170 || 255 || 590 || 22.7 || 2.2 || 3.3 || 7.7 || align=center|
|-
|align="left"| || align="center"|G || align="left"|Georgetown || align="center"|2 || align="center"| || 91 || 1,325 || 96 || 193 || 423 || 14.6 || 1.1 || 2.1 || 4.6 || align=center|
|-
|align="left"| || align="center"|G || align="left"|North Carolina || align="center"|1 || align="center"| || 7 || 163 || 7 || 38 || 47 || 23.3 || 1.0 || 5.4 || 6.7 || align=center|
|-
|align="left"| || align="center"|F/C || align="left"|South Carolina || align="center"|1 || align="center"| || 71 || 1,165 || 329 || 49 || 463 || 16.4 || 4.6 || 0.7 || 6.5 || align=center|
|-
|align="left"| || align="center"|G || align="left"|Villanova || align="center"|1 || align="center"| || 69 || 1,284 || 155 || 135 || 357 || 18.6 || 2.2 || 2.0 || 5.2 || align=center|
|-
|align="left"| || align="center"|F/C || align="left"|Grambling State || align="center"|1 || align="center"| || 75 || 1,370 || 416 || 66 || 554 || 18.3 || 5.5 || 0.9 || 7.4 || align=center|
|}

G

|-
|align="left"| || align="center"|C || align="left"|UCLA || align="center"|1 || align="center"| || 14 || 166 || 49 || 3 || 39 || 11.9 || 3.5 || 0.2 || 2.8 || align=center|
|-
|align="left"| || align="center"|G || align="left"|Loyola Marymount || align="center"|1 || align="center"| || 32 || 337 || 19 || 67 || 67 || 10.5 || 0.6 || 2.1 || 2.1 || align=center|
|-
|align="left"| || align="center"|G || align="left"|Georgia || align="center"|2 || align="center"|– || 67 || 939 || 132 || 151 || 346 || 14.0 || 2.0 || 2.3 || 5.2 || align=center|
|-
|align="left"| || align="center"|G || align="left"|Elizabeth City State || align="center"|2 || align="center"|– || 104 || 2,528 || 388 || 289 || 792 || 24.3 || 3.7 || 2.8 || 7.6 || align=center|
|-
|align="left"| || align="center"|F/C || align="left"|Farragut Academy (IL) || align="center"|2 || align="center"|– || 96 || 1,963 || 643 || 151 || 637 || 20.4 || 6.7 || 1.6 || 6.6 || align=center|
|-
|align="left"| || align="center"|F/C || align="left"|Old Dominion || align="center"|3 || align="center"|– || 78 || 1,732 || 421 || 68 || 791 || 22.2 || 5.4 || 0.9 || 10.1 || align=center|
|-
|align="left"| || align="center"|G || align="left"|UConn || align="center"|3 || align="center"|– || 174 || 2,011 || 179 || 325 || 732 || 11.6 || 1.0 || 1.9 || 4.2 || align=center|
|-
|align="left"| || align="center"|F || align="left"|UTSA || align="center"|2 || align="center"|– || 77 || 1,082 || 175 || 38 || 676 || 14.1 || 2.3 || 0.5 || 8.8 || align=center|
|-
|align="left"| || align="center"|G || align="left"|Weber State || align="center"|2 || align="center"| || 21 || 301 || 31 || 45 || 77 || 14.3 || 1.5 || 2.1 || 3.7 || align=center|
|-
|align="left"| || align="center"|G || align="left"|Illinois || align="center"|6 || align="center"|– || 331 || 11,203 || 1,591 || 981 || 4,932 || 33.8 || 4.8 || 3.0 || 14.9 || align=center|
|-
|align="left"| || align="center"|F || align="left"|Montana State || align="center"|1 || align="center"| || 2 || 27 || 7 || 0 || 2 || 13.5 || 3.5 || 0.0 || 1.0 || align=center|
|-
|align="left"| || align="center"|F/C || align="left"|UNLV || align="center"|3 || align="center"|– || 242 || 7,297 || 1,826 || 308 || 3,611 || 30.2 || 7.5 || 1.3 || 14.9 || align=center|
|-
|align="left"| || align="center"|G/F || align="left"|Ole Miss || align="center"|1 || align="center"| || 10 || 56 || 6 || 4 || 21 || 5.6 || 0.6 || 0.4 || 2.1 || align=center|
|-
|align="left"| || align="center"|C || align="left"|Duke || align="center"|8 || align="center"|– || 550 || 13,638 || 3,671 || 711 || 6,415 || 24.8 || 6.7 || 1.3 || 11.7 || align=center|
|-
|align="left"| || align="center"|G || align="left"|Houston || align="center"|1 || align="center"| || 6 || 19 || 1 || 1 || 4 || 3.2 || 0.2 || 0.2 || 0.7 || align=center|
|-
|align="left"| || align="center"|F || align="left"|Princeton || align="center"|1 || align="center"| || 9 || 50 || 5 || 5 || 5 || 5.6 || 0.6 || 0.6 || 0.6 || align=center|
|-
|align="left"| || align="center"|G || align="left"|Kentucky || align="center"|1 || align="center"| || 12 || 184 || 28 || 23 || 95 || 15.3 || 2.3 || 1.9 || 7.9 || align=center|
|-
|align="left"| || align="center"|G || align="left"|Indiana || align="center"|1 || align="center"| || 45 || 485 || 42 || 41 || 184 || 10.8 || 0.9 || 0.9 || 4.1 || align=center|
|-
|align="left"| || align="center"|G || align="left"|Oklahoma State || align="center"|1 || align="center"| || 59 || 959 || 123 || 40 || 198 || 16.3 || 2.1 || 0.7 || 3.4 || align=center|
|-
|align="left"| || align="center"|G || align="left"|VCU || align="center"|1 || align="center"| || 35 || 715 || 107 || 34 || 184 || 20.4 || 3.1 || 1.0 || 5.3 || align=center|
|-
|align="left"| || align="center"|F || align="left"|UNLV || align="center"|1 || align="center"| || 5 || 42 || 3 || 2 || 13 || 8.4 || 0.6 || 0.4 || 2.6 || align=center|
|-
|align="left"| || align="center"|F || align="left"|Rutgers || align="center"|1 || align="center"| || 4 || 20 || 2 || 1 || 2 || 5.0 || 0.5 || 0.3 || 0.5 || align=center|
|-
|align="left"| || align="center"|G/F || align="left"|Gulf Shores Academy (TX) || align="center"|1 || align="center"| || 31 || 781 || 108 || 34 || 400 || 25.2 || 3.5 || 1.1 || 12.9 || align=center|
|-
|align="left"| || align="center"|F || align="left"|LIU Brooklyn || align="center"|2 || align="center"|– || 85 || 903 || 318 || 30 || 381 || 10.6 || 3.7 || 0.4 || 4.5 || align=center|
|-
|align="left"| || align="center"|G || align="left"|Louisiana || align="center"|1 || align="center"| || 3 || 5 || 0 || 1 || 3 || 1.7 || 0.0 || 0.3 || 1.0 || align=center|
|-
|align="left"| || align="center"|F/C || align="left"|South Carolina || align="center"|2 || align="center"|– || 65 || 908 || 221 || 46 || 322 || 14.0 || 3.4 || 0.7 || 5.0 || align=center|
|-
|align="left"| || align="center"|F/C || align="left"|Alliant International || align="center"|1 || align="center"| || 4 || 74 || 25 || 0 || 18 || 18.5 || 6.3 || 0.0 || 4.5 || align=center|
|-
|align="left"| || align="center"|G || align="left"|California || align="center"|2 || align="center"|– || 25 || 288 || 29 || 37 || 78 || 11.5 || 1.2 || 1.5 || 3.1 || align=center|
|}

H

|-
|align="left"| || align="center"|F || align="left"|Syracuse || align="center"|1 || align="center"| || 1 || 8 || 3 || 0 || 2 || 8.0 || 3.0 || 0.0 || 2.0 || align=center|
|-
|align="left"| || align="center"|F/C || align="left"|UCLA || align="center"|4 || align="center"|–– || 170 || 2,329 || 685 || 58 || 832 || 13.7 || 4.0 || 0.3 || 4.9 || align=center|
|-
|align="left"| || align="center"|C || align="left"|LSU || align="center"|1 || align="center"| || 64 || 1,177 || 262 || 55 || 442 || 18.4 || 4.1 || 0.9 || 6.9 || align=center|
|-
|align="left" bgcolor="#FFCC00"|+ || align="center"|G || align="left"|Wisconsin || align="center"|4 || align="center"|– || 212 || 7,277 || 645 || 1,473 || 3,747 || 34.3 || 3.0 || 6.9 || 17.7 || align=center|
|-
|align="left" bgcolor="#CCFFCC"|x || align="center"|G || align="left"|Virginia || align="center"|3 || align="center"|– || 206 || 5,406 || 698 || 363 || 2,315 || 26.2 || 3.4 || 1.8 || 11.2 || align=center|
|-
|align="left"| || align="center"|G || align="left"|Long Beach State || align="center"|7 || align="center"|– || 456 || 9,884 || 1,173 || 714 || 3,528 || 21.7 || 2.6 || 1.6 || 7.7 || align=center|
|-
|align="left"| || align="center"|F || align="left"|Florida || align="center"|1 || align="center"| || 3 || 16 || 7 || 1 || 8 || 5.3 || 2.3 || 0.3 || 2.7 || align=center|
|-
|align="left"| || align="center"|G || align="left"|Austin Peay || align="center"|3 || align="center"|– || 131 || 2,510 || 337 || 116 || 473 || 19.2 || 2.6 || 0.9 || 3.6 || align=center|
|-
|align="left"| || align="center"|G || align="left"|Illinois State || align="center"|2 || align="center"|– || 67 || 1,824 || 204 || 130 || 1,169 || 27.2 || 3.0 || 1.9 || 17.4 || align=center|
|-
|align="left"| || align="center"|F || align="left"|Georgia || align="center"|2 || align="center"|– || 119 || 2,865 || 375 || 94 || 994 || 24.1 || 3.2 || 0.8 || 8.4 || align=center|
|-
|align="left"| || align="center"|G || align="left"|Boston University || align="center"|1 || align="center"| || 47 || 494 || 45 || 47 || 144 || 10.5 || 1.0 || 1.0 || 3.1 || align=center|
|-
|align="left"| || align="center"|F || align="left"|Washington State || align="center"|2 || align="center"|– || 27 || 423 || 70 || 16 || 121 || 15.7 || 2.6 || 0.6 || 4.5 || align=center|
|-
|align="left"| || align="center"|G/F || align="left"|Duke || align="center"|1 || align="center"| || 19 || 439 || 70 || 37 || 262 || 23.1 || 3.7 || 1.9 || 13.8 || align=center|
|-
|align="left"| || align="center"|F || align="left"|Fresno State || align="center"|1 || align="center"| || 2 || 29 || 8 || 1 || 6 || 14.5 || 4.0 || 0.5 || 3.0 || align=center|
|-
|align="left"| || align="center"|G/F || align="left"|Michigan || align="center"|1 || align="center"| || 57 || 735 || 77 || 29 || 268 || 12.9 || 1.4 || 0.5 || 4.7 || align=center|
|-
|align="left"| || align="center"|F/C || align="left"|San Jose State || align="center"|1 || align="center"| || 45 || 1,220 || 338 || 49 || 590 || 27.1 || 7.5 || 1.1 || 13.1 || align=center|
|-
|align="left"| || align="center"|F/C || align="left"|Rutgers || align="center"|4 || align="center"|– || 164 || 5,173 || 1,061 || 169 || 2,568 || 31.5 || 6.5 || 1.0 || 15.7 || align=center|
|-
|align="left"| || align="center"|F || align="left"|Arizona || align="center"|4 || align="center"|– || 234 || 5,530 || 1,375 || 460 || 2,315 || 23.6 || 5.9 || 2.0 || 9.9 || align=center|
|-
|align="left"| || align="center"|C || align="left"|Villanova || align="center"|1 || align="center"| || 40 || 1,256 || 411 || 106 || 440 || 31.4 || 10.3 || 2.7 || 11.0 || align=center|
|-
|align="left"| || align="center"|F/C || align="left"|Nebraska || align="center"|1 || align="center"| || 2 || 10 || 4 || 0 || 2 || 5.0 || 2.0 || 0.0 || 1.0 || align=center|
|-
|align="left"| || align="center"|G/F || align="left"|Ohio State || align="center"|3 || align="center"|– || 202 || 5,467 || 624 || 372 || 2,626 || 27.1 || 3.1 || 1.8 || 13.0 || align=center|
|-
|align="left"| || align="center"|F || align="left"|NC State || align="center"|1 || align="center"| || 8 || 22 || 5 || 0 || 5 || 2.8 || 0.6 || 0.0 || 0.6 || align=center|
|-
|align="left"| || align="center"|G || align="left"|Arizona State || align="center"|1 || align="center"| || 56 || 946 || 92 || 67 || 468 || 16.9 || 1.6 || 1.2 || 8.4 || align=center|
|-
|align="left"| || align="center"|C || align="left"|Wisconsin || align="center"|3 || align="center"|– || 221 || 5,097 || 1,579 || 191 || 1,136 || 23.1 || 7.1 || 0.9 || 5.1 || align=center|
|-
|align="left"| || align="center"|F/C || align="left"|Minnesota || align="center"|4 || align="center"|– || 245 || 6,320 || 2,100 || 231 || 2,327 || 25.8 || 8.6 || 0.9 || 9.5 || align=center|
|-
|align="left"| || align="center"|F/C || align="left"|Loyola (IL) || align="center"|2 || align="center"|– || 84 || 2,969 || 694 || 217 || 1,327 || 35.3 || 8.3 || 2.6 || 15.8 || align=center|
|}

I to J

|-
|align="left"| || align="center"|C || align="left"|Serbia || align="center"|1 || align="center"| || 5 || 6 || 1 || 0 || 0 || 1.2 || 0.2 || 0.0 || 0.0 || align=center|
|-
|align="left"| || align="center"|G || align="left"|Georgia Tech || align="center"|2 || align="center"|– || 112 || 3,268 || 381 || 609 || 1,368 || 29.2 || 3.4 || 5.4 || 12.2 || align=center|
|-
|align="left"| || align="center"|G/F || align="left"|Georgetown || align="center"|1 || align="center"| || 28 || 160 || 24 || 13 || 67 || 5.7 || 0.9 || 0.5 || 2.4 || align=center|
|-
|align="left"| || align="center"|G || align="left"|Ohio State || align="center"|1 || align="center"| || 31 || 1,155 || 184 || 160 || 512 || 37.3 || 5.9 || 5.2 || 16.5 || align=center|
|-
|align="left"| || align="center"|C || align="left"|Temple || align="center"|1 || align="center"| || 37 || 433 || 89 || 22 || 170 || 11.7 || 2.4 || 0.6 || 4.6 || align=center|
|-
|align="left" bgcolor="#FFFF99"|^ || align="center"|F/C || align="left"|North Dakota || align="center"|2 || align="center"|– || 75 || 1,264 || 202 || 97 || 439 || 16.9 || 2.7 || 1.3 || 5.9 || align=center|
|-
|align="left"| || align="center"|G/F || align="left"|Butler CC || align="center"|1 || align="center"| || 77 || 1,660 || 208 || 140 || 635 || 21.6 || 2.7 || 1.8 || 8.2 || align=center|
|-
|align="left"| || align="center"|G/F || align="left"|St. John's || align="center"|2 || align="center"|– || 77 || 2,658 || 503 || 140 || 1,440 || 34.5 || 6.5 || 1.8 || 18.7 || align=center|
|-
|align="left"| || align="center"|G/F || align="left"|Ohio || align="center"|1 || align="center"| || 4 || 10 || 3 || 1 || 1 || 2.5 || 0.8 || 0.3 || 0.3 || align=center|
|-
|align="left"| || align="center"|G/F || align="left"|Texas || align="center"|3 || align="center"|– || 34 || 573 || 119 || 23 || 144 || 16.9 || 3.5 || 0.7 || 4.2 || align=center|
|-
|align="left"| || align="center"|F || align="left"|Baylor || align="center"|1 || align="center"| || 50 || 531 || 145 || 16 || 183 || 10.6 || 2.9 || 0.3 || 3.7 || align=center|
|-
|align="left"| || align="center"|F || align="left"|Arizona || align="center"|7 || align="center"|– || 489 || 17,499 || 2,627 || 1,486 || 8,507 || 35.8 || 5.4 || 3.0 || 17.4 || align=center|
|-
|align="left"| || align="center"|G || align="left"|College of Charleston || align="center"|2 || align="center"|– || 100 || 1,208 || 107 || 134 || 364 || 12.1 || 1.1 || 1.3 || 3.6 || align=center|
|-
|align="left"| || align="center"|G || align="left"|Nevada || align="center"|1 || align="center"| || 8 || 119 || 12 || 11 || 45 || 14.9 || 1.5 || 1.4 || 5.6 || align=center|
|-
|align="left"| || align="center"|C || align="left"|Tennessee State || align="center"|2 || align="center"|– || 100 || 3,078 || 1,101 || 114 || 1,305 || 30.8 || 11.0 || 1.1 || 13.1 || align=center|
|-
|align="left"| || align="center"|F/C || align="left"|Dillard || align="center"|4 || align="center"|– || 305 || 7,388 || 2,182 || 394 || 1,912 || 24.2 || 7.2 || 1.3 || 6.3 || align=center|
|-
|align="left" bgcolor="#FFCC00"|+ || align="center"|G/F || align="left"|Arkansas || align="center"|4 || align="center"|– || 288 || 9,942 || 1,096 || 993 || 4,240 || 34.5 || 3.8 || 3.4 || 14.7 || align=center|
|-
|align="left"| || align="center"|F || align="left"|Tulane || align="center"|1 || align="center"| || 9 || 35 || 7 || 2 || 11 || 3.9 || 0.8 || 0.2 || 1.2 || align=center|
|-
|align="left"| || align="center"|F || align="left"|Aurora || align="center"|2 || align="center"| || 121 || 2,575 || 556 || 361 || 1,180 || 21.3 || 4.6 || 3.0 || 9.8 || align=center|
|-
|align="left"| || align="center"|F/C || align="left"|Tennessee || align="center"|1 || align="center"| || 72 || 818 || 138 || 40 || 346 || 11.4 || 1.9 || 0.6 || 4.8 || align=center|
|-
|align="left"| || align="center"|F/C || align="left"|Murray State || align="center"|2 || align="center"|– || 64 || 1,401 || 371 || 53 || 545 || 21.9 || 5.8 || 0.8 || 8.5 || align=center|
|-
|align="left"| || align="center"|F || align="left"|Iowa || align="center"|1 || align="center"| || 37 || 307 || 47 || 20 || 129 || 8.3 || 1.3 || 0.5 || 3.5 || align=center|
|-
|align="left"| || align="center"|G || align="left"|Houston || align="center"|1 || align="center"| || 11 || 131 || 13 || 13 || 49 || 11.9 || 1.2 || 1.2 || 4.5 || align=center|
|-
|align="left"| || align="center"|F/C || align="left"|Nevada || align="center"|1 || align="center"| || 60 || 950 || 263 || 43 || 524 || 15.8 || 4.4 || 0.7 || 8.7 || align=center|
|-
|align="left"| || align="center"|G || align="left"|St. Bonaventure || align="center"|1 || align="center"| || 6 || 16 || 2 || 5 || 7 || 2.7 || 0.3 || 0.8 || 1.2 || align=center|
|-
|align="left"| || align="center"|F/C || align="left"|Memphis || align="center"|2 || align="center"|– || 117 || 3,304 || 622 || 177 || 1,456 || 28.2 || 5.3 || 1.5 || 12.4 || align=center|
|-
|align="left"| || align="center"|G || align="left"|Rutgers || align="center"|4 || align="center"|– || 229 || 6,198 || 611 || 1,113 || 2,700 || 27.1 || 2.7 || 4.9 || 11.8 || align=center|
|-
|align="left"| || align="center"|C || align="left"|Tulsa || align="center"|1 || align="center"| || 44 || 383 || 105 || 13 || 138 || 8.7 || 2.4 || 0.3 || 3.1 || align=center|
|-
|align="left"| || align="center"|F || align="left"|Syracuse || align="center"|1 || align="center"| || 4 || 30 || 2 || 0 || 2 || 7.5 || 0.5 || 0.0 || 0.5 || align=center|
|-
|align="left"| || align="center"|C || align="left"|Georgia Tech || align="center"|1 || align="center"| || 1 || 5 || 0 || 0 || 2 || 5.0 || 0.0 || 0.0 || 2.0 || align=center|
|}

K to L

|-
|align="left"| || align="center"|G/F || align="left"|Russia || align="center"|2 || align="center"|– || 73 || 954 || 124 || 81 || 250 || 13.1 || 1.7 || 1.1 || 3.4 || align=center|
|-
|align="left"| || align="center"|F/C || align="left"|Stanford || align="center"|1 || align="center"| || 57 || 1,466 || 397 || 128 || 569 || 25.7 || 7.0 || 2.2 || 10.0 || align=center|
|-
|align="left"| || align="center"|F || align="left"|Memphis || align="center"|2 || align="center"|– || 168 || 6,073 || 1,862 || 234 || 2,904 || 36.1 || 11.1 || 1.4 || 17.3 || align=center|
|-
|align="left" bgcolor="#FFFF99"|^ (#5) || align="center"|G || align="left"|California || align="center"|7 || align="center"|– || 506 || 18,733 || 3,662 || bgcolor="#CFECEC"|4,620 || 7,373 || 37.0 || 7.2 || 9.1 || 14.6 || align=center|
|-
|align="left"| || align="center"|G || align="left"|Cincinnati || align="center"|3 || align="center"|– || 109 || 2,471 || 365 || 198 || 1,316 || 22.7 || 3.3 || 1.8 || 12.1 || align=center|
|-
|align="left"| || align="center"|G/F || align="left"|Maryland || align="center"|6 || align="center"|– || 410 || 10,393 || 1,895 || 978 || 5,595 || 25.3 || 4.6 || 2.4 || 13.6 || align=center|
|-
|align="left" bgcolor="#FFFF99"|^ || align="center"|F || align="left"|Tennessee || align="center"|3 || align="center"|– || 193 || 6,381 || 1,496 || 506 || 3,901 || 33.1 || 7.8 || 2.6 || 20.2 || align=center|
|-
|align="left"| || align="center"|F || align="left"|Russia || align="center"|2 || align="center"|– || 52 || 893 || 154 || 73 || 229 || 17.2 || 3.0 || 1.4 || 4.4 || align=center|
|-
|align="left"| || align="center"|G || align="left"|Villanova || align="center"|7 || align="center"|–– || 496 || 16,686 || 1,951 || 1,275 || 7,096 || 33.6 || 3.9 || 2.6 || 14.3 || align=center|
|-
|align="left"| || align="center"|C || align="left"|Arkansas || align="center"|1 || align="center"| || 28 || 453 || 114 || 23 || 84 || 16.2 || 4.1 || 0.8 || 3.0 || align=center|
|-
|align="left"| || align="center"|F/C || align="left"|Davidson || align="center"|1 || align="center"| || 1 || 3 || 0 || 0 || 0 || 3.0 || 0.0 || 0.0 || 0.0 || align=center|
|-
|align="left"| || align="center"|F || align="left"|Providence || align="center"|1 || align="center"| || 5 || 30 || 7 || 4 || 6 || 6.0 || 1.4 || 0.8 || 1.2 || align=center|
|-
|align="left"| || align="center"|G/F || align="left"|NYU || align="center"|1 || align="center"| || 7 || 56 || 13 || 3 || 27 || 8.0 || 1.9 || 0.4 || 3.9 || align=center|
|-
|align="left"| || align="center"|C || align="left"|Serbia || align="center"|4 || align="center"|– || 226 || 6,094 || 1,290 || 238 || 2,551 || 27.0 || 5.7 || 1.1 || 11.3 || align=center|
|-
|align="left"| || align="center"|F || align="left"|UConn || align="center"|1 || align="center"| || 7 || 28 || 8 || 4 || 11 || 4.0 || 1.1 || 0.6 || 1.6 || align=center|
|-
|align="left" bgcolor="#CCFFCC"|x || align="center"|F || align="left"|Latvia || align="center"|1 || align="center"| || 63 || 1,294 || 246 || 52 || 534 || 20.5 || 3.9 || 0.8 || 8.5 || align=center|
|-
|align="left"| || align="center"|C || align="left"|New Mexico State || align="center"|1 || align="center"| || 54 || 650 || 103 || 73 || 155 || 12.0 || 1.9 || 1.4 || 2.9 || align=center|
|-
|align="left"| || align="center"|G/F || align="left"|Marquette || align="center"|2 || align="center"|– || 71 || 1,200 || 164 || 137 || 413 || 16.9 || 2.3 || 1.9 || 5.8 || align=center|
|-
|align="left"| || align="center"|F || align="left"|Southern Miss || align="center"|2 || align="center"|– || 55 || 1,073 || 229 || 104 || 306 || 19.5 || 4.2 || 1.9 || 5.6 || align=center|
|-
|align="left"| || align="center"|F/C || align="left"|North Carolina || align="center"|1 || align="center"| || 1 || 8 || 2 || 0 || 1 || 8.0 || 2.0 || 0.0 || 1.0 || align=center|
|-
|align="left"| || align="center"|G || align="left"|Miami (FL) || align="center"|1 || align="center"| || 78 || 1,751 || 180 || 342 || 566 || 22.4 || 2.3 || 4.4 || 7.3 || align=center|
|-
|align="left"| || align="center"|F/C || align="left"|Niagara || align="center"|3 || align="center"|– || 69 || 2,282 || 711 || 93 || 982 || 33.1 || 10.3 || 1.3 || 14.2 || align=center|
|-
|align="left"| || align="center"|G || align="left"|Western Kentucky || align="center"|1 || align="center"| || 71 || 2,375 || 252 || 121 || 885 || 33.5 || 3.5 || 1.7 || 12.5 || align=center|
|-
|align="left"| || align="center"|G/F || align="left"|Purdue || align="center"|2 || align="center"|– || 51 || 340 || 37 || 27 || 125 || 6.7 || 0.7 || 0.5 || 2.5 || align=center|
|-
|align="left"| || align="center"|F/C || align="left"|Memphis || align="center"|1 || align="center"| || 57 || 840 || 259 || 42 || 271 || 14.7 || 4.5 || 0.7 || 4.8 || align=center|
|-
|align="left"| || align="center"|G || align="left"|Towson || align="center"|1 || align="center"| || 48 || 265 || 30 || 34 || 66 || 5.5 || 0.6 || 0.7 || 1.4 || align=center|
|-
|align="left"| || align="center"|G || align="left"|Campbell || align="center"|1 || align="center"| || 46 || 679 || 39 || 104 || 344 || 14.8 || 0.8 || 2.3 || 7.5 || align=center|
|-
|align="left"| || align="center"|G || align="left"|LIU Brooklyn || align="center"|1 || align="center"| || 24 || 707 || 72 || 93 || 273 || 29.5 || 3.0 || 3.9 || 11.4 || align=center|
|-
|align="left"| || align="center"|F || align="left"|Houston || align="center"|1 || align="center"| || 26 || 442 || 107 || 9 || 129 || 17.0 || 4.1 || 0.3 || 5.0 || align=center|
|-
|align="left" bgcolor="#CCFFCC"|x || align="center"|G/F || align="left"|Michigan || align="center"|3 || align="center"|– || 168 || 4,164 || 599 || 565 || 1,873 || 24.8 || 3.6 || 3.4 || 11.1 || align=center|
|-
|align="left"| || align="center"|G || align="left"|Harvard || align="center"|2 || align="center"|– || 37 || 908 || 135 || 188 || 541 || 24.5 || 3.6 || 5.1 || 14.6 || align=center|
|-
|align="left"| || align="center"|G || align="left"|Peoria HS (IL) || align="center"|1 || align="center"| || 76 || 1,974 || 246 || 245 || 629 || 26.0 || 3.2 || 3.2 || 8.3 || align=center|
|-
|align="left"| || align="center"|G || align="left"|Rutgers || align="center"|2 || align="center"|– || 125 || 2,353 || 220 || 229 || 1,127 || 18.8 || 1.8 || 1.8 || 9.0 || align=center|
|-
|align="left" bgcolor="#FFCC00"|+ || align="center"|C || align="left"|Stanford || align="center" bgcolor="#CFECEC"|9 || align="center"|– || 562 || 18,118 || 4,005 || 867 || bgcolor="#CFECEC"|10,444 || 32.2 || 7.1 || 1.5 || 18.6 || align=center|
|-
|align="left"| || align="center"|F || align="left"|Southern || align="center"|1 || align="center"| || 13 || 228 || 38 || 4 || 131 || 17.5 || 2.9 || 0.3 || 10.1 || align=center|
|-
|align="left"| || align="center"|F/C || align="left"|Marquette || align="center"|2 || align="center"|– || 90 || 2,870 || 787 || 256 || 1,334 || 31.9 || 8.7 || 2.8 || 14.8 || align=center|
|}

M

|-
|align="left"| || align="center"|C || align="left"|Washington || align="center"|1 || align="center"| || 62 || 1,502 || 378 || 78 || 604 || 24.2 || 6.1 || 1.3 || 9.7 || align=center|
|-
|align="left"| || align="center"|F || align="left"|UCLA || align="center"|1 || align="center"| || 9 || 42 || 5 || 0 || 3 || 4.7 || 0.6 || 0.0 || 0.3 || align=center|
|-
|align="left"| || align="center"|C || align="left"|Kentucky || align="center"|1 || align="center"| || 24 || 259 || 81 || 7 || 44 || 10.8 || 3.4 || 0.3 || 1.8 || align=center|
|-
|align="left"| || align="center"|F || align="left"|Clemson || align="center"|1 || align="center"| || 48 || 1,594 || 387 || 64 || 662 || 33.2 || 8.1 || 1.3 || 13.8 || align=center|
|-
|align="left"| || align="center"|G || align="left"|Manhattan || align="center"|1 || align="center"| || 19 || 181 || 14 || 12 || 58 || 9.5 || 0.7 || 0.6 || 3.1 || align=center|
|-
|align="left"| || align="center"|F/C || align="left"|Hampton || align="center"|4 || align="center"|– || 210 || 2,383 || 605 || 80 || 668 || 11.3 || 2.9 || 0.4 || 3.2 || align=center|
|-
|align="left"| || align="center"|F || align="left"|Jackson State || align="center"|1 || align="center"| || 70 || 992 || 212 || 58 || 241 || 14.2 || 3.0 || 0.8 || 3.4 || align=center|
|-
|align="left"| || align="center"|G || align="left"|Utah || align="center"|1 || align="center"| || 23 || 284 || 39 || 45 || 83 || 12.3 || 1.7 || 2.0 || 3.6 || align=center|
|-
|align="left" bgcolor="#FFCC00"|+ || align="center"|G || align="left"|Georgia Tech || align="center"|3 || align="center"|– || 172 || 6,672 || 525 || 1,398 || 3,963 || 38.8 || 3.1 || 8.1 || 23.0 || align=center|
|-
|align="left"| || align="center"|F || align="left"|UConn || align="center"|2 || align="center"|– || 23 || 124 || 24 || 5 || 30 || 5.4 || 1.0 || 0.2 || 1.3 || align=center|
|-
|align="left" bgcolor="#FFCC00"|+ || align="center"|F || align="left"|Cincinnati || align="center"|4 || align="center"|– || 283 || 9,656 || 2,147 || 668 || 4,269 || 34.1 || 7.6 || 2.4 || 15.1 || align=center|
|-
|align="left"| || align="center"|F || align="left"|Tennessee State || align="center"|1 || align="center"| || 21 || 108 || 34 || 7 || 37 || 5.1 || 1.6 || 0.3 || 1.8 || align=center|
|-
|align="left"| || align="center"|F || align="left"|Maryland || align="center"|1 || align="center"| || 79 || 1,954 || 517 || 23 || 568 || 24.7 || 6.5 || 0.3 || 7.2 || align=center|
|-
|align="left"| || align="center"|F || align="left"|Savannah State || align="center"|1 || align="center"| || 51 || 656 || 194 || 28 || 173 || 12.9 || 3.8 || 0.5 || 3.4 || align=center|
|-
|align="left" bgcolor="#FFFF99"|^ || align="center"|F/C || align="left"|North Carolina || align="center"|1 || align="center"| || 10 || 153 || 26 || 10 || 93 || 15.3 || 2.6 || 1.0 || 9.3 || align=center|
|-
|align="left"| || align="center"|G || align="left"|Tennessee State || align="center"|1 || align="center"| || 1 || 8 || 1 || 0 || 4 || 8.0 || 1.0 || 0.0 || 4.0 || align=center|
|-
|align="left"| || align="center"|G || align="left"|Tennessee State || align="center"|1 || align="center"| || 30 || 696 || 73 || 106 || 340 || 23.2 || 2.4 || 3.5 || 11.3 || align=center|
|-
|align="left"| || align="center"|C || align="left"|Michigan || align="center"|1 || align="center"| || 47 || 1,513 || 323 || 92 || 662 || 32.2 || 6.9 || 2.0 || 14.1 || align=center|
|-
|align="left"| || align="center"|F || align="left"|Syracuse || align="center"|2 || align="center"|– || 38 || 434 || 85 || 11 || 147 || 11.4 || 2.2 || 0.3 || 3.9 || align=center|
|-
|align="left"| || align="center"|F || align="left"|Wichita State || align="center"|2 || align="center"|– || 82 || 1,350 || 349 || 74 || 371 || 16.5 || 4.3 || 0.9 || 4.5 || align=center|
|-
|align="left"| || align="center"|G/F || align="left"|Clemson || align="center"|1 || align="center"| || 20 || 293 || 52 || 9 || 126 || 14.7 || 2.6 || 0.5 || 6.3 || align=center|
|-
|align="left"| || align="center"|G/F || align="left"|Michigan || align="center"|1 || align="center"| || 80 || 2,027 || 189 || 116 || 1,038 || 25.3 || 2.4 || 1.5 || 13.0 || align=center|
|-
|align="left"| || align="center"|G/F || align="left"|North Carolina A&T || align="center"|1 || align="center"| || 24 || 645 || 76 || 76 || 297 || 26.9 || 3.2 || 3.2 || 12.4 || align=center|
|-
|align="left"| || align="center"|C || align="left"|Marquette || align="center"|3 || align="center"|– || 106 || 1,510 || 319 || 42 || 233 || 14.2 || 3.0 || 0.4 || 2.2 || align=center|
|-
|align="left"| || align="center"|G || align="left"|North Carolina || align="center"|1 || align="center"| || 28 || 486 || 50 || 52 || 149 || 17.4 || 1.8 || 1.9 || 5.3 || align=center|
|-
|align="left"| || align="center"|F || align="left"|St. John's || align="center"|2 || align="center"| || 28 || 545 || 121 || 16 || 199 || 19.5 || 4.3 || 0.6 || 7.1 || align=center|
|-
|align="left"| || align="center"|G/F || align="left"|Creighton || align="center"|3 || align="center"|– || 116 || 1,870 || 157 || 191 || 692 || 16.1 || 1.4 || 1.6 || 6.0 || align=center|
|-
|align="left"| || align="center"|F/C || align="left"|Marquette || align="center"|1 || align="center"| || 8 || 93 || 26 || 3 || 60 || 11.6 || 3.3 || 0.4 || 7.5 || align=center|
|-
|align="left"| (#25) || align="center"|G || align="left"|Villanova || align="center"|7 || align="center"|– || 502 || 15,337 || 1,082 || 3,044 || 6,230 || 30.6 || 2.2 || 6.1 || 12.4 || align=center|
|-
|align="left"| || align="center"|G/F || align="left"|Kentucky || align="center"|1 || align="center"| || 18 || 390 || 40 || 20 || 137 || 21.7 || 2.2 || 1.1 || 7.6 || align=center|
|-
|align="left"| || align="center"|F || align="left"|Michigan || align="center"|2 || align="center"|– || 120 || 2,254 || 594 || 101 || 929 || 18.8 || 5.0 || 0.8 || 7.7 || align=center|
|-
|align="left"| || align="center"|F/C || align="left"|UCLA || align="center"|1 || align="center"| || 8 || 24 || 7 || 0 || 8 || 3.0 || 0.9 || 0.0 || 1.0 || align=center|
|-
|align="left"| || align="center"|G || align="left"|Arizona || align="center"|1 || align="center"| || 47 || 1,434 || 125 || 249 || 786 || 30.5 || 2.7 || 5.3 || 16.7 || align=center|
|-
|align="left"| || align="center"|C || align="left"|North Carolina || align="center"|1 || align="center"| || 31 || 844 || 282 || 29 || 157 || 27.2 || 9.1 || 0.9 || 5.1 || align=center|
|-
|align="left"| || align="center"|F/C || align="left"|Saint Louis || align="center"|1 || align="center"| || 68 || 1,149 || 409 || 40 || 502 || 16.9 || 6.0 || 0.6 || 7.4 || align=center|
|-
|align="left"| || align="center"|G || align="left"|Texas || align="center"|1 || align="center"| || 1 || 10 || 2 || 1 || 0 || 10.0 || 2.0 || 1.0 || 0.0 || align=center|
|-
|align="left"| || align="center"|G || align="left"|West Virginia || align="center"|1 || align="center"| || 71 || 1,406 || 168 || 228 || 497 || 19.8 || 2.4 || 3.2 || 7.0 || align=center|
|-
|align="left"| || align="center"|F/C || align="left"|Nebraska || align="center"|2 || align="center"| || 83 || 2,092 || 405 || 74 || 778 || 25.2 || 4.9 || 0.9 || 9.4 || align=center|
|-
|align="left"| || align="center"|F || align="left"|Auburn || align="center"|7 || align="center"|– || 510 || 15,274 || 2,918 || 1,015 || 6,762 || 29.9 || 5.7 || 2.0 || 13.3 || align=center|
|-
|align="left"| || align="center"|G || align="left"|Michigan || align="center"|1 || align="center"| || 38 || 299 || 27 || 48 || 83 || 7.9 || 0.7 || 1.3 || 2.2 || align=center|
|-
|align="left"| || align="center"|G || align="left"|Georgia Tech || align="center"|2 || align="center"|– || 120 || 3,492 || 299 || 129 || 1,511 || 29.1 || 2.5 || 1.1 || 12.6 || align=center|
|-
|align="left" bgcolor="#FFFF99"|^ || align="center"|C || align="left"|Georgetown || align="center"|2 || align="center"|– || 30 || 672 || 154 || 22 || 283 || 22.4 || 5.1 || 0.7 || 9.4 || align=center|
|-
|align="left"| || align="center"|C || align="left"|Russia || align="center"|1 || align="center"| || 31 || 359 || 98 || 11 || 131 || 11.6 || 3.2 || 0.4 || 4.2 || align=center|
|-
|align="left"| || align="center"|G || align="left"|Providence || align="center"|1 || align="center"| || 15 || 401 || 35 || 66 || 119 || 26.7 || 2.3 || 4.4 || 7.9 || align=center|
|-
|align="left"| || align="center"|C || align="left"|Romania || align="center"|2 || align="center"|– || 31 || 268 || 68 || 9 || 105 || 8.6 || 2.2 || 0.3 || 3.4 || align=center|
|-
|align="left"| || align="center"|F/C || align="left"|Notre Dame || align="center"|1 || align="center"| || 18 || 288 || 75 || 17 || 65 || 16.0 || 4.2 || 0.9 || 3.6 || align=center|
|-
|align="left"| || align="center"|F || align="left"|California || align="center"|1 || align="center"| || 57 || 576 || 132 || 13 || 196 || 10.1 || 2.3 || 0.2 || 3.4 || align=center|
|-
|align="left" bgcolor="#CCFFCC"|x || align="center"|G/F || align="left"|Bosnia and Herzegovina || align="center"|1 || align="center"| || 9 || 39 || 5 || 2 || 19 || 4.3 || 0.6 || 0.2 || 2.1 || align=center|
|-
|align="left" bgcolor="#FFFF99"|^ || align="center"|C || align="left"|Georgetown || align="center"|1 || align="center"| || 24 || 514 || 153 || 19 || 138 || 21.4 || 6.4 || 0.8 || 5.8 || align=center|
|-
|align="left"| || align="center"|G/F || align="left"|Little Rock || align="center"|1 || align="center"| || 28 || 543 || 68 || 100 || 198 || 19.4 || 2.4 || 3.6 || 7.1 || align=center|
|}

N to O

|-
|align="left"| || align="center"|F || align="left"|Slovenia || align="center"|3 || align="center"|– || 162 || 3,289 || 524 || 154 || 1,465 || 20.3 || 3.2 || 1.0 || 9.0 || align=center|
|-
|align="left"| || align="center"|F || align="left"|Oklahoma || align="center"|2 || align="center"|– || 40 || 523 || 105 || 34 || 128 || 13.1 || 2.6 || 0.9 || 3.2 || align=center|
|-
|align="left"| || align="center"|G || align="left"|UConn || align="center"|1 || align="center"| || 56 || 983 || 100 || 143 || 529 || 17.6 || 1.8 || 2.6 || 9.4 || align=center|
|-
|align="left"| || align="center"|C || align="left"|UCLA || align="center"|1 || align="center"| || 43 || 1,016 || 441 || 19 || 376 || 23.6 || 10.3 || 0.4 || 8.7 || align=center|
|-
|align="left"| || align="center"|F || align="left"|Louisiana-Monroe || align="center"|1 || align="center"| || 53 || 2,046 || 513 || 112 || 1,042 || 38.6 || 9.7 || 2.1 || 19.7 || align=center|
|-
|align="left"| || align="center"|G || align="left"|Washington || align="center"|1 || align="center"| || 25 || 353 || 49 || 29 || 212 || 14.1 || 2.0 || 1.2 || 8.5 || align=center|
|-
|align="left"| || align="center"|G/F || align="left"|Utah || align="center"|2 || align="center"|– || 157 || 5,421 || 483 || 613 || 3,322 || 34.5 || 3.1 || 3.9 || 21.2 || align=center|
|-
|align="left"| || align="center"|G/F || align="left"|Richmond || align="center"|3 || align="center"|– || 227 || 5,080 || 452 || 223 || 2,313 || 22.4 || 2.0 || 1.0 || 10.2 || align=center|
|-
|align="left"| || align="center"|F || align="left"|St. Bonaventure || align="center"|1 || align="center"| || 10 || 111 || 27 || 3 || 30 || 11.1 || 2.7 || 0.3 || 3.0 || align=center|
|-
|align="left"| || align="center"|G || align="left"|Ohio State || align="center"|1 || align="center"| || 76 || 1,555 || 193 || 155 || 731 || 20.5 || 2.5 || 2.0 || 9.6 || align=center|
|-
|align="left"| || align="center"|F || align="left"|UCLA || align="center"|2 || align="center"|– || 109 || 1,887 || 280 || 91 || 588 || 17.3 || 2.6 || 0.8 || 5.4 || align=center|
|-
|align="left"| || align="center"|F || align="left"|Maryland || align="center"|1 || align="center"| || 11 || 54 || 17 || 6 || 39 || 4.9 || 1.5 || 0.5 || 3.5 || align=center|
|-
|align="left"| || align="center"|F/C || align="left"|Duke || align="center"|1 || align="center"| || 26 || 328 || 76 || 11 || 166 || 12.6 || 2.9 || 0.4 || 6.4 || align=center|
|-
|align="left"| || align="center"|G/F || align="left"|North Carolina || align="center"|7 || align="center"|– || 392 || 8,687 || 1,377 || 843 || 3,323 || 22.2 || 3.5 || 2.2 || 8.5 || align=center|
|-
|align="left"| || align="center"|F/C || align="left"|Turkey || align="center"|1 || align="center"| || 17 || 454 || 81 || 30 || 130 || 26.7 || 4.8 || 1.8 || 7.6 || align=center|
|-
|align="left"| || align="center"|G || align="left"|UConn || align="center"|1 || align="center"| || 19 || 161 || 23 || 25 || 22 || 8.5 || 1.2 || 1.3 || 1.2 || align=center|
|-
|align="left"| || align="center"|C || align="left"|Fordham || align="center"|1 || align="center"| || 3 || 10 || 4 || 0 || 4 || 3.3 || 1.3 || 0.0 || 1.3 || align=center|
|-
|align="left"| || align="center"|F || align="left"|Starkville HS (MS) || align="center"|1 || align="center"| || 82 || 2,358 || 325 || 84 || 756 || 28.8 || 4.0 || 1.0 || 9.2 || align=center|
|-
|align="left"| || align="center"|G || align="left"|La Salle || align="center"|3 || align="center"| || 26 || 512 || 42 || 73 || 155 || 19.7 || 1.6 || 2.8 || 6.0 || align=center|
|-
|align="left"| || align="center"|F || align="left"|Oral Roberts || align="center"|1 || align="center"| || 7 || 75 || 13 || 4 || 13 || 10.7 || 1.9 || 0.6 || 1.9 || align=center|
|}

P to R

|-
|align="left"| || align="center"|G || align="left"|USC || align="center"|2 || align="center"| || 60 || 1,405 || 104 || 352 || 591 || 23.4 || 1.7 || 5.9 || 9.9 || align=center|
|-
|align="left"| || align="center"|F || align="left"|Kentucky || align="center"|1 || align="center"| || 62 || 718 || 165 || 41 || 211 || 11.6 || 2.7 || 0.7 || 3.4 || align=center|
|-
|align="left"| || align="center"|F/C || align="left"|St. John's || align="center"|5 || align="center"|– || 404 || 13,804 || 4,544 || 823 || 6,297 || 34.2 || 11.2 || 2.0 || 15.6 || align=center|
|-
|align="left"| || align="center"|G || align="left"|Memphis || align="center"|2 || align="center"|– || 90 || 1,046 || 87 || 174 || 395 || 11.6 || 1.0 || 1.9 || 4.4 || align=center|
|-
|align="left"| || align="center"|G || align="left"|Virginia Tech || align="center"|1 || align="center"| || 23 || 812 || 95 || 85 || 444 || 35.3 || 4.1 || 3.7 || 19.3 || align=center|
|-
|align="left"| || align="center"|F/C || align="left"|Temple || align="center"|1 || align="center"| || 22 || 167 || 35 || 6 || 52 || 7.6 || 1.6 || 0.3 || 2.4 || align=center|
|-
|align="left"| || align="center"|C || align="left"|France || align="center"|2 || align="center"|– || 136 || 1,813 || 436 || 89 || 523 || 13.3 || 3.2 || 0.7 || 3.8 || align=center|
|-
|align="left" bgcolor="#FFFF99"|^ (#3) || align="center"|G || align="left"|Yugoslavia || align="center"|3 || align="center"|– || 195 || 6,569 || 540 || 565 || 3,798 || 33.7 || 2.8 || 2.9 || 19.5 || align=center|
|-
|align="left"| || align="center"|G/F || align="left"|Bradley || align="center"|1 || align="center"| || 28 || 541 || 70 || 32 || 327 || 19.3 || 2.5 || 1.1 || 11.7 || align=center|
|-
|align="left"| || align="center"|F || align="left"|Alabama || align="center"|1 || align="center"| || 48 || 416 || 77 || 29 || 152 || 8.7 || 1.6 || 0.6 || 3.2 || align=center|
|-
|align="left"| || align="center"|G/F || align="left"|Kansas || align="center"|1 || align="center"| || 75 || 2,098 || 348 || 178 || 1,010 || 28.0 || 4.6 || 2.4 || 13.5 || align=center|
|-
|align="left" bgcolor="#CCFFCC"|x || align="center"|G || align="left"|North Carolina || align="center"|1 || align="center"| || 18 || 211 || 36 || 21 || 81 || 11.7 || 2.0 || 1.2 || 4.5 || align=center|
|-
|align="left"| || align="center"|G || align="left"|Croatia || align="center"|3 || align="center"|– || 148 || 1,584 || 198 || 165 || 561 || 10.7 || 1.3 || 1.1 || 3.8 || align=center|
|-
|align="left"| || align="center"|F/C || align="left"|Duke || align="center"|2 || align="center"|– || 152 || 3,018 || 820 || 134 || 1,237 || 19.9 || 5.4 || 0.9 || 8.1 || align=center|
|-
|align="left"| || align="center"|F/C || align="left"|Villanova || align="center"|1 || align="center"| || 55 || 1,216 || 262 || 40 || 706 || 22.1 || 4.8 || 0.7 || 12.8 || align=center|
|-
|align="left"| || align="center"|G || align="left"|Saint Francis (PA) || align="center"|1 || align="center"| || 74 || 2,686 || 199 || 801 || 1,197 || 36.3 || 2.7 || bgcolor="#CFECEC"|10.8 || 16.2 || align=center|
|-
|align="left"| || align="center"|G || align="left"|Notre Dame || align="center"|1 || align="center"| || 25 || 223 || 16 || 29 || 56 || 8.9 || 0.6 || 1.2 || 2.2 || align=center|
|-
|align="left"| || align="center"|G || align="left"|Ohio State || align="center"|3 || align="center"|– || 240 || 5,130 || 373 || 1,090 || 2,070 || 21.4 || 1.6 || 4.5 || 8.6 || align=center|
|-
|align="left"| || align="center"|F/C || align="left"|Saint Louis || align="center"|1 || align="center"| || 39 || 426 || 122 || 10 || 182 || 10.9 || 3.1 || 0.3 || 4.7 || align=center|
|-
|align="left"| || align="center"|G || align="left"|Arizona || align="center"|2 || align="center"|– || 81 || 1,463 || 127 || 216 || 531 || 18.1 || 1.6 || 2.7 || 6.6 || align=center|
|-
|align="left" bgcolor="#FFCC00"|+ || align="center"|G/F || align="left"|Montana || align="center"|4 || align="center"|– || 208 || 7,018 || 1,029 || 1,410 || 3,357 || 33.7 || 4.9 || 6.8 || 16.1 || align=center|
|-
|align="left"| || align="center"|G || align="left"|Saint Peter's || align="center"|1 || align="center"| || 5 || 28 || 5 || 1 || 12 || 5.6 || 1.0 || 0.2 || 2.4 || align=center|
|-
|align="left"| || align="center"|G/F || align="left"|Michigan || align="center"|1 || align="center"| || 10 || 37 || 6 || 2 || 10 || 3.7 || 0.6 || 0.2 || 1.0 || align=center|
|-
|align="left"| || align="center"|F || align="left"|USC || align="center"|2 || align="center"|– || 133 || 3,483 || 987 || 203 || 2,180 || 26.2 || 7.4 || 1.5 || 16.4 || align=center|
|-
|align="left"| || align="center"|F/C || align="left"|UConn || align="center"|3 || align="center"|– || 159 || 3,417 || 484 || 170 || 927 || 21.5 || 3.0 || 1.1 || 5.8 || align=center|
|-
|align="left"| || align="center"|G || align="left"|Michigan || align="center"|2 || align="center"|– || 97 || 1,886 || 183 || 368 || 773 || 19.4 || 1.9 || 3.8 || 8.0 || align=center|
|-
|align="left"| || align="center"|F || align="left"|Kansas || align="center"|1 || align="center"| || 71 || 917 || 359 || 46 || 307 || 12.9 || 5.1 || 0.6 || 4.3 || align=center|
|-
|align="left"| || align="center"|G || align="left"|South Carolina || align="center"|3 || align="center"|– || 209 || 6,462 || 377 || 815 || 2,735 || 30.9 || 1.8 || 3.9 || 13.1 || align=center|
|-
|align="left"| || align="center"|F || align="left"|Wake Forest || align="center"|2 || align="center"|– || 137 || 2,712 || 570 || 244 || 1,017 || 19.8 || 4.2 || 1.8 || 7.4 || align=center|
|-
|align="left"| || align="center"|G || align="left"|SMU || align="center"|1 || align="center"| || 36 || 353 || 30 || 10 || 57 || 9.8 || 0.8 || 0.3 || 1.6 || align=center|
|-
|align="left" bgcolor="#FFCC00"|+ || align="center"|G || align="left"|Ohio State || align="center"|2 || align="center"|– || 129 || 3,682 || 504 || 812 || 2,455 || 28.5 || 3.9 || 6.3 || 19.0 || align=center|
|}

S

|-
|align="left"| || align="center"|C || align="left"|Mali || align="center"|1 || align="center"| || 34 || 226 || 53 || 1 || 46 || 6.6 || 1.6 || 0.0 || 1.4 || align=center|
|-
|align="left"| || align="center"|F || align="left"|Loyola (IL) || align="center"|1 || align="center"| || 33 || 298 || 75 || 7 || 96 || 9.0 || 2.3 || 0.2 || 2.9 || align=center|
|-
|align="left"| || align="center"|F || align="left"|USC || align="center"|4 || align="center"|– || 210 || 3,109 || 609 || 220 || 819 || 14.8 || 2.9 || 1.0 || 3.9 || align=center|
|-
|align="left"| || align="center"|F || align="left"|St. John's || align="center"|3 || align="center"|– || 106 || 1,270 || 200 || 66 || 596 || 12.0 || 1.9 || 0.6 || 5.6 || align=center|
|-
|align="left"| || align="center"|C || align="left"|Florida || align="center"|3 || align="center"|– || 78 || 672 || 178 || 30 || 163 || 8.6 || 2.3 || 0.4 || 2.1 || align=center|
|-
|align="left"| || align="center"|F || align="left"|Argentina || align="center"|1 || align="center"| || 36 || 461 || 139 || 37 || 184 || 12.8 || 3.9 || 1.0 || 5.1 || align=center|
|-
|align="left"| || align="center"|C || align="left"|Syracuse || align="center"|2 || align="center"|– || 18 || 240 || 57 || 10 || 57 || 13.3 || 3.2 || 0.6 || 3.2 || align=center|
|-
|align="left"| || align="center"|F/C || align="left"|NC State || align="center"|2 || align="center"|– || 130 || 2,041 || 632 || 77 || 760 || 15.7 || 4.9 || 0.6 || 5.8 || align=center|
|-
|align="left"| || align="center"|F || align="left"|Georgia || align="center"|2 || align="center"|– || 36 || 230 || 37 || 15 || 55 || 6.4 || 1.0 || 0.4 || 1.5 || align=center|
|-
|align="left"| || align="center"|G/F || align="left"|Jackson State || align="center"|1 || align="center"| || 82 || 2,213 || 248 || 145 || 1,072 || 27.0 || 3.0 || 1.8 || 13.1 || align=center|
|-
|align="left"| || align="center"|G/F || align="left"|DePaul || align="center"|2 || align="center"|– || 94 || 2,124 || 340 || 107 || 678 || 22.6 || 3.6 || 1.1 || 7.2 || align=center|
|-
|align="left"| || align="center"|G/F || align="left"|Benedict College || align="center"|3 || align="center"|– || 227 || 7,964 || 1,552 || 740 || 3,634 || 35.1 || 6.8 || 3.3 || 16.0 || align=center|
|-
|align="left"| || align="center"|G/F || align="left"|Michigan State || align="center"|2 || align="center"|– || 40 || 608 || 72 || 82 || 263 || 15.2 || 1.8 || 2.1 || 6.6 || align=center|
|-
|align="left"| || align="center"|C || align="left"|Georgetown || align="center"|1 || align="center"| || 14 || 263 || 72 || 9 || 91 || 18.8 || 5.1 || 0.6 || 6.5 || align=center|
|-
|align="left"| || align="center"|G || align="left"|UMass || align="center"|5 || align="center"|– || 244 || 5,722 || 884 || 772 || 2,496 || 23.5 || 3.6 || 3.2 || 10.2 || align=center|
|-
|align="left"| || align="center"|F || align="left"|Wyoming || align="center"|1 || align="center"| || 4 || 10 || 2 || 0 || 5 || 2.5 || 0.5 || 0.0 || 1.3 || align=center|
|-
|align="left"| || align="center"|G || align="left"|Marshall || align="center"|2 || align="center"|– || 58 || 439 || 56 || 28 || 145 || 7.6 || 1.0 || 0.5 || 2.5 || align=center|
|-
|align="left"| || align="center"|G || align="left"|Texas A&M || align="center"|1 || align="center"| || 61 || 1,318 || 173 || 268 || 424 || 21.6 || 2.8 || 4.4 || 7.0 || align=center|
|-
|align="left"| || align="center"|C || align="left"|LSU || align="center"|1 || align="center"| || 45 || 648 || 111 || 38 || 166 || 14.4 || 2.5 || 0.8 || 3.7 || align=center|
|-
|align="left"| || align="center"|G || align="left"|Louisville || align="center"|1 || align="center"| || 5 || 46 || 7 || 4 || 7 || 9.2 || 1.4 || 0.8 || 1.4 || align=center|
|-
|align="left"| || align="center"|F || align="left"|Maryland || align="center"|1 || align="center"| || 4 || 25 || 3 || 1 || 2 || 6.3 || 0.8 || 0.3 || 0.5 || align=center|
|-
|align="left"| || align="center"|C || align="left"|CSU–Pueblo || align="center"|1 || align="center"| || 16 || 165 || 60 || 3 || 23 || 10.3 || 3.8 || 0.2 || 1.4 || align=center|
|-
|align="left"| || align="center"|G || align="left"|UNLV || align="center"|1 || align="center"| || 59 || 736 || 76 || 85 || 309 || 12.5 || 1.3 || 1.4 || 5.2 || align=center|
|-
|align="left"| || align="center"|F/C || align="left"|Weber State || align="center"|2 || align="center"|– || 161 || 2,336 || 610 || 96 || 818 || 14.5 || 3.8 || 0.6 || 5.1 || align=center|
|-
|align="left"| || align="center"|G || align="left"|Duquesne || align="center"|1 || align="center"| || 31 || 1,325 || 135 || 106 || 747 || 42.7 || 4.4 || 3.4 || 24.1 || align=center|
|-
|align="left"| || align="center"|G || align="left"|Villanova || align="center"|1 || align="center"| || 15 || 212 || 18 || 32 || 56 || 14.1 || 1.2 || 2.1 || 3.7 || align=center|
|-
|align="left"| || align="center"|F || align="left"|Virginia Union || align="center"|1 || align="center"| || 70 || 1,590 || 329 || 66 || 852 || 22.7 || 4.7 || 0.9 || 12.2 || align=center|
|-
|align="left"| || align="center"|G/F || align="left"|North Carolina || align="center"|1 || align="center"| || 37 || 544 || 33 || 35 || 182 || 14.7 || 0.9 || 0.9 || 4.9 || align=center|
|-
|align="left"| || align="center"|G || align="left"|Michigan || align="center"|1 || align="center"| || 35 || 478 || 63 || 38 || 177 || 13.7 || 1.8 || 1.1 || 5.1 || align=center|
|-
|align="left"| || align="center"|C || align="left"|Georgia || align="center"|1 || align="center"| || 29 || 280 || 109 || 16 || 82 || 9.7 || 3.8 || 0.6 || 2.8 || align=center|
|-
|align="left"| || align="center"|G || align="left"|Washington Union HS (CA) || align="center"|1 || align="center"| || 51 || 960 || 101 || 41 || 148 || 18.8 || 2.0 || 0.8 || 2.9 || align=center|
|-
|align="left"| || align="center"|G/F || align="left"|Arizona State || align="center"|1 || align="center"| || 9 || 32 || 5 || 1 || 8 || 3.6 || 0.6 || 0.1 || 0.9 || align=center|
|-
|align="left"| || align="center"|F || align="left"|Temple || align="center"|1 || align="center"| || 9 || 202 || 41 || 7 || 51 || 22.4 || 4.6 || 0.8 || 5.7 || align=center|
|-
|align="left"| || align="center"|F || align="left"|LSU || align="center"|2 || align="center"|– || 27 || 359 || 83 || 5 || 128 || 13.3 || 3.1 || 0.2 || 4.7 || align=center|
|}

T to V

|-
|align="left"| || align="center"|G/F || align="left"|Bradley || align="center"|4 || align="center"|– || 173 || 6,200 || 900 || 526 || 3,527 || 35.8 || 5.2 || 3.0 || 20.4 || align=center|
|-
|align="left"| || align="center"|G || align="left"|Princeton || align="center"|4 || align="center"|– || 271 || 8,887 || 811 || 1,002 || 3,804 || 32.8 || 3.0 || 3.7 || 14.0 || align=center|
|-
|align="left"| || align="center"|G || align="left"|Eastern Illinois || align="center"|1 || align="center"| || 17 || 114 || 11 || 5 || 51 || 6.7 || 0.6 || 0.3 || 3.0 || align=center|
|-
|align="left"| || align="center"|G/F || align="left"|Houston || align="center"|3 || align="center"|– || 170 || 3,584 || 651 || 309 || 1,430 || 21.1 || 3.8 || 1.8 || 8.4 || align=center|
|-
|align="left"| || align="center"|C || align="left"|USC || align="center"|1 || align="center"| || 72 || 873 || 286 || 64 || 360 || 12.1 || 4.0 || 0.9 || 5.0 || align=center|
|-
|align="left"| || align="center"|G || align="left"|Kansas || align="center"|2 || align="center"|– || 61 || 491 || 33 || 57 || 174 || 8.0 || 0.5 || 0.9 || 2.9 || align=center|
|-
|align="left"| || align="center"|G || align="left"|Kentucky || align="center"|1 || align="center"| || 21 || 201 || 21 || 30 || 62 || 9.6 || 1.0 || 1.4 || 3.0 || align=center|
|-
|align="left"| || align="center"|F || align="left"|Bosnia and Herzegovina || align="center"|3 || align="center"|– || 165 || 2,787 || 555 || 126 || 1,149 || 16.9 || 3.4 || 0.8 || 7.0 || align=center|
|-
|align="left"| || align="center"|F || align="left"|Long Beach State || align="center"|2 || align="center"|– || 127 || 2,045 || 287 || 77 || 524 || 16.1 || 2.3 || 0.6 || 4.1 || align=center|
|-
|align="left"| || align="center"|G || align="left"|Arizona || align="center"|1 || align="center"| || 35 || 570 || 37 || 56 || 159 || 16.3 || 1.1 || 1.6 || 4.5 || align=center|
|-
|align="left"| || align="center"|G || align="left"|UNLV || align="center"|1 || align="center"| || 81 || 2,955 || 229 || 378 || 1,510 || 36.5 || 2.8 || 4.7 || 18.6 || align=center|
|-
|align="left"| || align="center"|G || align="left"|Kansas || align="center"|2 || align="center"| || 29 || 364 || 36 || 17 || 94 || 12.6 || 1.2 || 0.6 || 3.2 || align=center|
|-
|align="left"| || align="center"|F || align="left"|Providence || align="center"|1 || align="center"| || 5 || 56 || 9 || 0 || 13 || 11.2 || 1.8 || 0.0 || 2.6 || align=center|
|-
|align="left"| || align="center"|F || align="left"|Minnesota || align="center"|1 || align="center"| || 2 || 36 || 10 || 0 || 2 || 18.0 || 5.0 || 0.0 || 1.0 || align=center|
|-
|align="left"| || align="center"|G || align="left"|LSU || align="center"|1 || align="center"| || 26 || 620 || 74 || 30 || 320 || 23.8 || 2.8 || 1.2 || 12.3 || align=center|
|-
|align="left"| || align="center"|F || align="left"|Indiana || align="center"|1 || align="center"| || 12 || 115 || 27 || 8 || 44 || 9.6 || 2.3 || 0.7 || 3.7 || align=center|
|-
|align="left"| || align="center"|F/C || align="left"|Vanderbilt || align="center"|3 || align="center"|– || 201 || 3,082 || 552 || 182 || 1,025 || 15.3 || 2.7 || 0.9 || 5.1 || align=center|
|-
|align="left"| || align="center"|G || align="left"|Tulsa || align="center"|1 || align="center"| || 42 || 438 || 61 || 69 || 158 || 10.4 || 1.5 || 1.6 || 3.8 || align=center|
|-
|align="left"| || align="center"|G/F || align="left"|Vanderbilt || align="center"|7 || align="center"|– || 434 || 10,155 || 1,778 || 815 || 2,596 || 23.4 || 4.1 || 1.9 || 6.0 || align=center|
|-
|align="left"| || align="center"|F || align="left"|Utah || align="center"|5 || align="center"|– || 314 || 10,881 || 2,398 || 575 || 5,700 || 34.7 || 7.6 || 1.8 || 18.2 || align=center|
|-
|align="left"| || align="center"|G || align="left"|Maryland || align="center"|1 || align="center"| || 3 || 39 || 2 || 5 || 7 || 13.0 || 0.7 || 1.7 || 2.3 || align=center|
|-
|align="left"| || align="center"|F || align="left"|Memphis || align="center"|2 || align="center"|– || 25 || 264 || 83 || 3 || 78 || 10.6 || 3.3 || 0.1 || 3.1 || align=center|
|-
|align="left"| || align="center"|G || align="left"|Kansas || align="center"|2 || align="center"|– || 151 || 2,644 || 198 || 258 || 647 || 17.5 || 1.3 || 1.7 || 4.3 || align=center|
|-
|align="left"| || align="center"|G || align="left"|UNLV || align="center"|1 || align="center"| || 1 || 4 || 0 || 1 || 0 || 4.0 || 0.0 || 1.0 || 0.0 || align=center|
|-
|align="left"| || align="center"|G || align="left"|Duke || align="center"|1 || align="center"| || 24 || 521 || 68 || 41 || 306 || 21.7 || 2.8 || 1.7 || 12.8 || align=center|
|-
|align="left"| || align="center"|G || align="left"|Slovenia || align="center"|1 || align="center"| || 56 || 1,594 || 182 || 127 || 636 || 28.5 || 3.3 || 2.3 || 11.4 || align=center|
|}

W

|-
|align="left"| || align="center"|G || align="left"|West Georgia || align="center"|4 || align="center"|– || 231 || 4,799 || 419 || 996 || 1,126 || 20.8 || 1.8 || 4.3 || 4.9 || align=center|
|-
|align="left"| || align="center"|F || align="left"|Alabama || align="center"|2 || align="center"|– || 85 || 2,649 || 428 || 230 || 774 || 31.2 || 5.0 || 2.7 || 9.1 || align=center|
|-
|align="left"| || align="center"|G || align="left"|Virginia Union || align="center"|1 || align="center"| || 9 || 91 || 13 || 3 || 42 || 10.1 || 1.4 || 0.3 || 4.7 || align=center|
|-
|align="left"| || align="center"|G || align="left"|Kansas || align="center"|3 || align="center"|– || 139 || 1,908 || 138 || 203 || 718 || 13.7 || 1.0 || 1.5 || 5.2 || align=center|
|-
|align="left"| || align="center"|G || align="left"|Middle Tennessee || align="center"|1 || align="center"| || 15 || 156 || 22 || 34 || 54 || 10.4 || 1.5 || 2.3 || 3.6 || align=center|
|-
|align="left"| || align="center"|G || align="left"|Syracuse || align="center"|2 || align="center"|– || 140 || 2,979 || 247 || 507 || 1,249 || 21.3 || 1.8 || 3.6 || 8.9 || align=center|
|-
|align="left"| || align="center"|F/C || align="left"|Cheyney || align="center"|2 || align="center"|– || 156 || 4,537 || 1,303 || 364 || 1,402 || 29.1 || 8.4 || 2.3 || 9.0 || align=center|
|-
|align="left"| || align="center"|F/C || align="left"|Old Dominion || align="center"|2 || align="center"|– || 86 || 1,662 || 436 || 56 || 712 || 19.3 || 5.1 || 0.7 || 8.3 || align=center|
|-
|align="left"| || align="center"|G || align="left"|Tennessee || align="center"|1 || align="center"| || 80 || 1,521 || 145 || 161 || 543 || 19.0 || 1.8 || 2.0 || 6.8 || align=center|
|-
|align="left"| || align="center"|F || align="left"|Boise State || align="center"|1 || align="center"| || 10 || 120 || 24 || 4 || 16 || 12.0 || 2.4 || 0.4 || 1.6 || align=center|
|-
|align="left"| || align="center"|F || align="left"|Saint Peter's || align="center"|1 || align="center"| || 8 || 14 || 1 || 1 || 6 || 1.8 || 0.1 || 0.1 || 0.8 || align=center|
|-
|align="left"| || align="center"|C || align="left"|St. John's || align="center"|2 || align="center"|– || 19 || 124 || 29 || 2 || 48 || 6.5 || 1.5 || 0.1 || 2.5 || align=center|
|-
|align="left"| || align="center"|G || align="left"|Baylor || align="center"|1 || align="center"| || 60 || 542 || 44 || 123 || 183 || 9.0 || 0.7 || 2.1 || 3.1 || align=center|
|-
|align="left"| || align="center"|G || align="left"|Georgia Tech || align="center"|1 || align="center"| || 6 || 116 || 11 || 10 || 22 || 19.3 || 1.8 || 1.7 || 3.7 || align=center|
|-
|align="left"| || align="center"|F || align="left"|Providence || align="center"|1 || align="center"| || 7 || 59 || 9 || 2 || 31 || 8.4 || 1.3 || 0.3 || 4.4 || align=center|
|-
|align="left"| || align="center"|G || align="left"|Seton Hall || align="center"|2 || align="center"|– || 89 || 1,823 || 210 || 212 || 643 || 20.5 || 2.4 || 2.4 || 7.2 || align=center|
|-
|align="left"| || align="center"|F/C || align="left"|Iowa State || align="center"|2 || align="center"|– || 68 || 1,802 || 658 || 94 || 859 || 26.5 || 9.7 || 1.4 || 12.6 || align=center|
|-
|align="left"| || align="center"|F || align="left"|Central State || align="center"|1 || align="center"| || 4 || 22 || 4 || 2 || 10 || 5.5 || 1.0 || 0.5 || 2.5 || align=center|
|-
|align="left"| || align="center"|F || align="left"|Eastern Washington || align="center"|1 || align="center"| || 5 || 33 || 11 || 2 || 4 || 6.6 || 2.2 || 0.4 || 0.8 || align=center|
|-
|align="left"| || align="center"|F/C || align="left"|Xavier || align="center"|5 || align="center"|– || 336 || 6,966 || 1,585 || 340 || 2,417 || 20.7 || 4.7 || 1.0 || 7.2 || align=center|
|-
|align="left"| || align="center"|F/C || align="left"|UC Santa Barbara || align="center"|1 || align="center"| || 5 || 26 || 19 || 3 || 18 || 5.2 || 3.8 || 0.6 || 3.6 || align=center|
|-
|align="left" bgcolor="#FFCC00"|+ (#52) || align="center"|F/C || align="left"|Maryland || align="center"|8 || align="center"|– || bgcolor="#CFECEC"|635 || bgcolor="#CFECEC"|23,100 || bgcolor="#CFECEC"|7,576 || 976 || 10,440 || 36.4 || bgcolor="#CFECEC"|11.9 || 1.5 || 16.4 || align=center|
|-
|align="left" bgcolor="#FFCC00"|+ || align="center"|G || align="left"|Illinois || align="center"|5 || align="center"|– || 277 || 9,470 || 875 || 2,078 || 4,609 || 34.2 || 3.2 || 7.5 || 16.6 || align=center|
|-
|align="left"| || align="center"|F/C || align="left"|Winston-Salem State || align="center"|1 || align="center"| || 1 || 7 || 2 || 1 || 3 || 7.0 || 2.0 || 1.0 || 3.0 || align=center|
|-
|align="left"| || align="center"|F || align="left"|Providence || align="center"|1 || align="center"| || 21 || 739 || 95 || 42 || 265 || 35.2 || 4.5 || 2.0 || 12.6 || align=center|
|-
|align="left" bgcolor="#FFCC00"|+ || align="center"|F/C || align="left"|St. John's || align="center"|7 || align="center"|– || 373 || 8,651 || 3,328 || 259 || 3,084 || 23.2 || 8.9 || 0.7 || 8.3 || align=center|
|-
|align="left"| || align="center"|F || align="left"|Maryland || align="center"|1 || align="center"| || 43 || 635 || 156 || 11 || 197 || 14.8 || 3.6 || 0.3 || 4.6 || align=center|
|-
|align="left"| || align="center"|G || align="left"|St. John's || align="center"|1 || align="center"| || 41 || 433 || 50 || 36 || 175 || 10.6 || 1.2 || 0.9 || 4.3 || align=center|
|-
|align="left"| || align="center"|G || align="left"|UConn || align="center"|2 || align="center"|– || 132 || 2,169 || 264 || 400 || 847 || 16.4 || 2.0 || 3.0 || 6.4 || align=center|
|-
|align="left"| || align="center"|G || align="left"|Minnesota || align="center"|3 || align="center"|– || 119 || 3,595 || 404 || 682 || 2,024 || 30.2 || 3.4 || 5.7 || 17.0 || align=center|
|-
|align="left"| || align="center"|G/F || align="left"|Georgetown || align="center"|1 || align="center"| || 11 || 167 || 24 || 8 || 71 || 15.2 || 2.2 || 0.7 || 6.5 || align=center|
|-
|align="left"| || align="center"|F/C || align="left"|Boston College || align="center"|3 || align="center"|– || 126 || 1,871 || 447 || 42 || 541 || 14.8 || 3.5 || 0.3 || 4.3 || align=center|
|-
|align="left"| || align="center"|F || align="left"|Memphis || align="center"|1 || align="center"| || 25 || 514 || 68 || 16 || 113 || 20.6 || 2.7 || 0.6 || 4.5 || align=center|
|-
|align="left"| || align="center"|F || align="left"|Duke || align="center"|1 || align="center"| || 58 || 1,276 || 350 || 35 || 268 || 22.0 || 6.0 || 0.6 || 4.6 || align=center|
|-
|align="left"| || align="center"|F || align="left"|Louisville || align="center"|2 || align="center"|– || 88 || 1,970 || 384 || 254 || 723 || 22.4 || 4.4 || 2.9 || 8.2 || align=center|
|-
|align="left"| (#23) || align="center"|G || align="left"|New Mexico State || align="center"|7 || align="center"|– || 405 || 12,321 || 1,028 || 1,142 || 7,202 || 30.4 || 2.5 || 2.8 || 17.8 || align=center|
|-
|align="left"| || align="center"|F/C || align="left"|Dwight Morrow HS (NJ) || align="center"|2 || align="center"|– || 77 || 1,020 || 204 || 64 || 327 || 13.2 || 2.6 || 0.8 || 4.2 || align=center|
|-
|align="left"| || align="center"|G || align="left"|Marquette || align="center"|2 || align="center"| || 13 || 135 || 17 || 17 || 30 || 10.4 || 1.3 || 1.3 || 2.3 || align=center|
|-
|align="left"| || align="center"|G || align="left"|George Mason || align="center"|1 || align="center"| || 6 || 47 || 1 || 6 || 21 || 7.8 || 0.2 || 1.0 || 3.5 || align=center|
|-
|align="left"| || align="center"|G || align="left"|Penn || align="center"|2 || align="center"|– || 47 || 1,042 || 80 || 140 || 310 || 22.2 || 1.7 || 3.0 || 6.6 || align=center|
|-
|align="left"| || align="center"|G || align="left"|Cal State Fullerton || align="center"|2 || align="center"| || 104 || 1,933 || 132 || 417 || 607 || 18.6 || 1.3 || 4.0 || 5.8 || align=center|
|-
|align="left"| || align="center"|G/F || align="left"|Indiana || align="center"|1 || align="center"| || 7 || 145 || 13 || 16 || 83 || 20.7 || 1.9 || 2.3 || 11.9 || align=center|
|-
|align="left"| || align="center"|F || align="left"|Notre Dame || align="center"|2 || align="center"|– || 94 || 3,260 || 458 || 332 || 1,863 || 34.7 || 4.9 || 3.5 || 19.8 || align=center|
|-
|align="left"| || align="center"|G || align="left"|UTEP || align="center"|1 || align="center"| || 24 || 460 || 35 || 39 || 145 || 19.2 || 1.5 || 1.6 || 6.0 || align=center|
|-
|align="left"| || align="center"|G/F || align="left"|Texas A&M || align="center"|3 || align="center"|– || 143 || 2,563 || 330 || 134 || 651 || 17.9 || 2.3 || 0.9 || 4.6 || align=center|
|-
|align="left"| || align="center"|F/C || align="left"|North Carolina || align="center"|1 || align="center"| || 16 || 184 || 48 || 7 || 58 || 11.5 || 3.0 || 0.4 || 3.6 || align=center|
|}

Y

|-
|align="left"|Yi Jianlian || align="center"|F || align="left"|China || align="center"|2 || align="center"|– || 113 || 3,076 || 698 || 107 || 1,148 || 27.2 || 6.2 || 0.9 || 10.2 || align=center|
|-
|align="left"| || align="center"|F || align="left"|Georgia Tech || align="center"|2 || align="center"|– || 101 || 3,236 || 826 || 173 || 1,488 || 32.0 || 8.2 || 1.7 || 14.7 || align=center|
|-
|align="left"| || align="center"|G || align="left"|Drake || align="center"|1 || align="center"| || 12 || 82 || 10 || 2 || 18 || 6.8 || 0.8 || 0.2 || 1.5 || align=center|
|-
|align="left"| || align="center"|F/C || align="left"|North Carolina || align="center"|1 || align="center"| || 42 || 703 || 194 || 28 || 300 || 16.7 || 4.6 || 0.7 || 7.1 || align=center|
|-
|align="left"| || align="center"|G || align="left"|Mississippi State || align="center"|1 || align="center"| || 2 || 32 || 4 || 7 || 4 || 16.0 || 2.0 || 3.5 || 2.0 || align=center|
|}

References

External links
Brooklyn Nets all-time roster

National Basketball Association all-time rosters
 
roster